

531001–531100 

|-bgcolor=#fefefe
| 531001 ||  || — || December 27, 2011 || Mount Lemmon || Mount Lemmon Survey ||  || align=right data-sort-value="0.58" | 580 m || 
|-id=002 bgcolor=#fefefe
| 531002 ||  || — || January 27, 2012 || Mount Lemmon || Mount Lemmon Survey || NYS || align=right data-sort-value="0.47" | 470 m || 
|-id=003 bgcolor=#fefefe
| 531003 ||  || — || September 13, 2007 || Mount Lemmon || Mount Lemmon Survey ||  || align=right data-sort-value="0.54" | 540 m || 
|-id=004 bgcolor=#fefefe
| 531004 ||  || — || January 20, 2012 || Kitt Peak || Spacewatch ||  || align=right data-sort-value="0.55" | 550 m || 
|-id=005 bgcolor=#fefefe
| 531005 ||  || — || January 21, 2012 || Kitt Peak || Spacewatch ||  || align=right data-sort-value="0.60" | 600 m || 
|-id=006 bgcolor=#fefefe
| 531006 ||  || — || February 9, 2005 || Mount Lemmon || Mount Lemmon Survey || ERI || align=right | 1.1 km || 
|-id=007 bgcolor=#fefefe
| 531007 ||  || — || December 26, 2011 || Mount Lemmon || Mount Lemmon Survey || H || align=right data-sort-value="0.57" | 570 m || 
|-id=008 bgcolor=#fefefe
| 531008 ||  || — || March 3, 2005 || Kitt Peak || Spacewatch ||  || align=right data-sort-value="0.55" | 550 m || 
|-id=009 bgcolor=#fefefe
| 531009 ||  || — || January 26, 2012 || Mount Lemmon || Mount Lemmon Survey ||  || align=right data-sort-value="0.57" | 570 m || 
|-id=010 bgcolor=#fefefe
| 531010 ||  || — || January 4, 2012 || Mount Lemmon || Mount Lemmon Survey ||  || align=right data-sort-value="0.52" | 520 m || 
|-id=011 bgcolor=#fefefe
| 531011 ||  || — || January 25, 2012 || Haleakala || Pan-STARRS ||  || align=right data-sort-value="0.47" | 470 m || 
|-id=012 bgcolor=#fefefe
| 531012 ||  || — || January 25, 2012 || Kitt Peak || Spacewatch ||  || align=right data-sort-value="0.56" | 560 m || 
|-id=013 bgcolor=#fefefe
| 531013 ||  || — || December 2, 2004 || Kitt Peak || Spacewatch ||  || align=right data-sort-value="0.83" | 830 m || 
|-id=014 bgcolor=#fefefe
| 531014 ||  || — || September 3, 2007 || Mount Lemmon || Mount Lemmon Survey || PHO || align=right data-sort-value="0.72" | 720 m || 
|-id=015 bgcolor=#C2E0FF
| 531015 ||  || — || May 31, 2010 || Haleakala || Pan-STARRS || SDO || align=right | 233 km || 
|-id=016 bgcolor=#C2E0FF
| 531016 ||  || — || January 25, 2011 || Haleakala || Pan-STARRS || SDOcritical || align=right | 169 km || 
|-id=017 bgcolor=#C2E0FF
| 531017 ||  || — || November 23, 2010 || Haleakala || Pan-STARRS || res2:5 || align=right | 261 km || 
|-id=018 bgcolor=#E9E9E9
| 531018 ||  || — || January 19, 2012 || Haleakala || Pan-STARRS ||  || align=right | 1.7 km || 
|-id=019 bgcolor=#fefefe
| 531019 ||  || — || January 18, 2012 || Catalina || CSS ||  || align=right data-sort-value="0.77" | 770 m || 
|-id=020 bgcolor=#fefefe
| 531020 ||  || — || January 19, 2012 || Kitt Peak || Spacewatch ||  || align=right data-sort-value="0.65" | 650 m || 
|-id=021 bgcolor=#fefefe
| 531021 ||  || — || January 20, 2012 || Kitt Peak || Spacewatch ||  || align=right data-sort-value="0.79" | 790 m || 
|-id=022 bgcolor=#fefefe
| 531022 ||  || — || January 27, 2012 || Kitt Peak || Spacewatch ||  || align=right data-sort-value="0.67" | 670 m || 
|-id=023 bgcolor=#fefefe
| 531023 ||  || — || January 26, 2012 || Mount Lemmon || Mount Lemmon Survey ||  || align=right data-sort-value="0.75" | 750 m || 
|-id=024 bgcolor=#fefefe
| 531024 ||  || — || January 26, 2012 || Haleakala || Pan-STARRS ||  || align=right data-sort-value="0.71" | 710 m || 
|-id=025 bgcolor=#fefefe
| 531025 ||  || — || March 10, 2005 || Kitt Peak || Spacewatch ||  || align=right data-sort-value="0.65" | 650 m || 
|-id=026 bgcolor=#d6d6d6
| 531026 ||  || — || January 19, 2012 || Kitt Peak || Spacewatch ||  || align=right | 4.1 km || 
|-id=027 bgcolor=#fefefe
| 531027 ||  || — || October 9, 2007 || Kitt Peak || Spacewatch ||  || align=right data-sort-value="0.52" | 520 m || 
|-id=028 bgcolor=#fefefe
| 531028 ||  || — || January 27, 2012 || Kitt Peak || Spacewatch ||  || align=right data-sort-value="0.55" | 550 m || 
|-id=029 bgcolor=#fefefe
| 531029 ||  || — || January 25, 2012 || Kitt Peak || Spacewatch ||  || align=right data-sort-value="0.63" | 630 m || 
|-id=030 bgcolor=#fefefe
| 531030 ||  || — || January 21, 2012 || Kitt Peak || Spacewatch ||  || align=right data-sort-value="0.52" | 520 m || 
|-id=031 bgcolor=#fefefe
| 531031 ||  || — || November 2, 2007 || Mount Lemmon || Mount Lemmon Survey ||  || align=right data-sort-value="0.53" | 530 m || 
|-id=032 bgcolor=#fefefe
| 531032 ||  || — || January 19, 2012 || Haleakala || Pan-STARRS || MAS || align=right data-sort-value="0.74" | 740 m || 
|-id=033 bgcolor=#fefefe
| 531033 ||  || — || January 12, 2008 || Mount Lemmon || Mount Lemmon Survey ||  || align=right data-sort-value="0.59" | 590 m || 
|-id=034 bgcolor=#fefefe
| 531034 ||  || — || February 1, 2005 || Kitt Peak || Spacewatch ||  || align=right data-sort-value="0.72" | 720 m || 
|-id=035 bgcolor=#fefefe
| 531035 ||  || — || January 26, 2012 || Kitt Peak || Spacewatch ||  || align=right data-sort-value="0.58" | 580 m || 
|-id=036 bgcolor=#fefefe
| 531036 ||  || — || April 16, 2005 || Kitt Peak || Spacewatch ||  || align=right data-sort-value="0.68" | 680 m || 
|-id=037 bgcolor=#fefefe
| 531037 ||  || — || March 4, 2005 || Kitt Peak || Spacewatch ||  || align=right data-sort-value="0.54" | 540 m || 
|-id=038 bgcolor=#fefefe
| 531038 ||  || — || January 19, 2012 || Mount Lemmon || Mount Lemmon Survey || H || align=right data-sort-value="0.68" | 680 m || 
|-id=039 bgcolor=#E9E9E9
| 531039 ||  || — || September 13, 2010 || La Sagra || OAM Obs. ||  || align=right | 2.3 km || 
|-id=040 bgcolor=#C2E0FF
| 531040 ||  || — || February 2, 2011 || Haleakala || Pan-STARRS || other TNOcritical || align=right | 243 km || 
|-id=041 bgcolor=#fefefe
| 531041 ||  || — || January 27, 2007 || Mount Lemmon || Mount Lemmon Survey || H || align=right data-sort-value="0.41" | 410 m || 
|-id=042 bgcolor=#d6d6d6
| 531042 ||  || — || February 3, 2012 || Haleakala || Pan-STARRS ||  || align=right | 2.8 km || 
|-id=043 bgcolor=#fefefe
| 531043 ||  || — || February 3, 2012 || Haleakala || Pan-STARRS ||  || align=right data-sort-value="0.45" | 450 m || 
|-id=044 bgcolor=#fefefe
| 531044 ||  || — || February 1, 2012 || Mount Lemmon || Mount Lemmon Survey ||  || align=right data-sort-value="0.54" | 540 m || 
|-id=045 bgcolor=#fefefe
| 531045 ||  || — || November 15, 2007 || Catalina || CSS ||  || align=right data-sort-value="0.56" | 560 m || 
|-id=046 bgcolor=#fefefe
| 531046 ||  || — || January 29, 2012 || Kitt Peak || Spacewatch ||  || align=right data-sort-value="0.75" | 750 m || 
|-id=047 bgcolor=#fefefe
| 531047 ||  || — || April 11, 2005 || Mount Lemmon || Mount Lemmon Survey ||  || align=right data-sort-value="0.55" | 550 m || 
|-id=048 bgcolor=#E9E9E9
| 531048 ||  || — || February 10, 2008 || Mount Lemmon || Mount Lemmon Survey ||  || align=right | 1.0 km || 
|-id=049 bgcolor=#fefefe
| 531049 ||  || — || January 19, 2012 || Kitt Peak || Spacewatch ||  || align=right data-sort-value="0.68" | 680 m || 
|-id=050 bgcolor=#fefefe
| 531050 ||  || — || March 9, 2005 || Mount Lemmon || Mount Lemmon Survey ||  || align=right data-sort-value="0.52" | 520 m || 
|-id=051 bgcolor=#fefefe
| 531051 ||  || — || February 24, 2008 || Mount Lemmon || Mount Lemmon Survey || (5026) || align=right data-sort-value="0.70" | 700 m || 
|-id=052 bgcolor=#fefefe
| 531052 ||  || — || February 24, 2012 || Kitt Peak || Spacewatch ||  || align=right data-sort-value="0.64" | 640 m || 
|-id=053 bgcolor=#fefefe
| 531053 ||  || — || February 25, 2012 || Kitt Peak || Spacewatch ||  || align=right data-sort-value="0.52" | 520 m || 
|-id=054 bgcolor=#fefefe
| 531054 ||  || — || October 9, 2007 || Mount Lemmon || Mount Lemmon Survey ||  || align=right data-sort-value="0.62" | 620 m || 
|-id=055 bgcolor=#fefefe
| 531055 ||  || — || February 24, 2012 || Kitt Peak || Spacewatch ||  || align=right data-sort-value="0.94" | 940 m || 
|-id=056 bgcolor=#E9E9E9
| 531056 ||  || — || September 21, 2009 || Mount Lemmon || Mount Lemmon Survey ||  || align=right | 1.8 km || 
|-id=057 bgcolor=#E9E9E9
| 531057 ||  || — || February 12, 2008 || Kitt Peak || Spacewatch ||  || align=right | 1.4 km || 
|-id=058 bgcolor=#fefefe
| 531058 ||  || — || January 18, 2012 || Kitt Peak || Spacewatch ||  || align=right data-sort-value="0.71" | 710 m || 
|-id=059 bgcolor=#E9E9E9
| 531059 ||  || — || March 1, 2008 || Kitt Peak || Spacewatch ||  || align=right | 1.5 km || 
|-id=060 bgcolor=#FFC2E0
| 531060 ||  || — || February 28, 2012 || Haleakala || Pan-STARRS || ATEPHA || align=right data-sort-value="0.37" | 370 m || 
|-id=061 bgcolor=#fefefe
| 531061 ||  || — || January 21, 2012 || Kitt Peak || Spacewatch ||  || align=right data-sort-value="0.51" | 510 m || 
|-id=062 bgcolor=#fefefe
| 531062 ||  || — || March 9, 2005 || Mount Lemmon || Mount Lemmon Survey ||  || align=right data-sort-value="0.74" | 740 m || 
|-id=063 bgcolor=#fefefe
| 531063 ||  || — || August 27, 2006 || Kitt Peak || Spacewatch ||  || align=right data-sort-value="0.64" | 640 m || 
|-id=064 bgcolor=#fefefe
| 531064 ||  || — || March 11, 2005 || Kitt Peak || Spacewatch ||  || align=right data-sort-value="0.59" | 590 m || 
|-id=065 bgcolor=#fefefe
| 531065 ||  || — || February 28, 2012 || Haleakala || Pan-STARRS ||  || align=right data-sort-value="0.54" | 540 m || 
|-id=066 bgcolor=#fefefe
| 531066 ||  || — || July 20, 2010 || WISE || WISE ||  || align=right data-sort-value="0.96" | 960 m || 
|-id=067 bgcolor=#fefefe
| 531067 ||  || — || January 30, 2012 || Kitt Peak || Spacewatch ||  || align=right data-sort-value="0.60" | 600 m || 
|-id=068 bgcolor=#E9E9E9
| 531068 ||  || — || February 26, 2012 || Haleakala || Pan-STARRS ||  || align=right | 1.1 km || 
|-id=069 bgcolor=#d6d6d6
| 531069 ||  || — || January 19, 2012 || Haleakala || Pan-STARRS || 7:4 || align=right | 2.9 km || 
|-id=070 bgcolor=#E9E9E9
| 531070 ||  || — || February 25, 2012 || Catalina || CSS ||  || align=right | 2.1 km || 
|-id=071 bgcolor=#FA8072
| 531071 ||  || — || March 11, 2005 || Catalina || CSS ||  || align=right data-sort-value="0.57" | 570 m || 
|-id=072 bgcolor=#fefefe
| 531072 ||  || — || November 3, 2007 || Mount Lemmon || Mount Lemmon Survey ||  || align=right data-sort-value="0.50" | 500 m || 
|-id=073 bgcolor=#fefefe
| 531073 ||  || — || January 18, 2008 || Kitt Peak || Spacewatch ||  || align=right data-sort-value="0.59" | 590 m || 
|-id=074 bgcolor=#C2E0FF
| 531074 ||  || — || February 27, 2012 || Haleakala || Pan-STARRS || twotinocritical || align=right | 152 km || 
|-id=075 bgcolor=#C2E0FF
| 531075 ||  || — || July 1, 2010 || Haleakala || Pan-STARRS || SDO || align=right | 161 km || 
|-id=076 bgcolor=#C2E0FF
| 531076 ||  || — || February 28, 2012 || Haleakala || Pan-STARRS || cubewano (cold)critical || align=right | 192 km || 
|-id=077 bgcolor=#C2E0FF
| 531077 ||  || — || August 5, 2010 || Haleakala || Pan-STARRS || plutino || align=right | 243 km || 
|-id=078 bgcolor=#fefefe
| 531078 ||  || — || February 27, 2012 || Haleakala || Pan-STARRS || H || align=right data-sort-value="0.57" | 570 m || 
|-id=079 bgcolor=#fefefe
| 531079 ||  || — || February 21, 2012 || Kitt Peak || Spacewatch || H || align=right data-sort-value="0.65" | 650 m || 
|-id=080 bgcolor=#fefefe
| 531080 ||  || — || April 2, 2005 || Mount Lemmon || Mount Lemmon Survey ||  || align=right data-sort-value="0.56" | 560 m || 
|-id=081 bgcolor=#fefefe
| 531081 ||  || — || October 29, 2010 || Mount Lemmon || Mount Lemmon Survey ||  || align=right data-sort-value="0.72" | 720 m || 
|-id=082 bgcolor=#E9E9E9
| 531082 ||  || — || February 27, 2012 || Haleakala || Pan-STARRS ||  || align=right | 1.1 km || 
|-id=083 bgcolor=#E9E9E9
| 531083 ||  || — || February 24, 2012 || Kitt Peak || Spacewatch ||  || align=right | 1.2 km || 
|-id=084 bgcolor=#fefefe
| 531084 ||  || — || February 18, 2008 || Mount Lemmon || Mount Lemmon Survey ||  || align=right data-sort-value="0.94" | 940 m || 
|-id=085 bgcolor=#fefefe
| 531085 ||  || — || September 29, 2010 || Mount Lemmon || Mount Lemmon Survey ||  || align=right data-sort-value="0.60" | 600 m || 
|-id=086 bgcolor=#fefefe
| 531086 ||  || — || February 23, 2012 || Mount Lemmon || Mount Lemmon Survey ||  || align=right data-sort-value="0.54" | 540 m || 
|-id=087 bgcolor=#fefefe
| 531087 ||  || — || October 14, 2007 || Mount Lemmon || Mount Lemmon Survey ||  || align=right data-sort-value="0.70" | 700 m || 
|-id=088 bgcolor=#fefefe
| 531088 ||  || — || February 14, 2005 || Kitt Peak || Spacewatch ||  || align=right data-sort-value="0.58" | 580 m || 
|-id=089 bgcolor=#E9E9E9
| 531089 ||  || — || February 27, 2012 || Haleakala || Pan-STARRS ||  || align=right | 1.9 km || 
|-id=090 bgcolor=#E9E9E9
| 531090 ||  || — || February 27, 2012 || Haleakala || Pan-STARRS ||  || align=right data-sort-value="0.63" | 630 m || 
|-id=091 bgcolor=#fefefe
| 531091 ||  || — || February 28, 2012 || Haleakala || Pan-STARRS ||  || align=right data-sort-value="0.55" | 550 m || 
|-id=092 bgcolor=#fefefe
| 531092 ||  || — || October 2, 2006 || Mount Lemmon || Mount Lemmon Survey ||  || align=right data-sort-value="0.70" | 700 m || 
|-id=093 bgcolor=#fefefe
| 531093 ||  || — || January 11, 2008 || Kitt Peak || Spacewatch ||  || align=right data-sort-value="0.78" | 780 m || 
|-id=094 bgcolor=#fefefe
| 531094 ||  || — || February 28, 2012 || Haleakala || Pan-STARRS ||  || align=right data-sort-value="0.54" | 540 m || 
|-id=095 bgcolor=#fefefe
| 531095 ||  || — || January 14, 2008 || Kitt Peak || Spacewatch ||  || align=right data-sort-value="0.59" | 590 m || 
|-id=096 bgcolor=#fefefe
| 531096 ||  || — || February 28, 2012 || Haleakala || Pan-STARRS ||  || align=right data-sort-value="0.50" | 500 m || 
|-id=097 bgcolor=#fefefe
| 531097 ||  || — || November 6, 1996 || Kitt Peak || Spacewatch ||  || align=right data-sort-value="0.80" | 800 m || 
|-id=098 bgcolor=#fefefe
| 531098 ||  || — || September 16, 2010 || Mount Lemmon || Mount Lemmon Survey ||  || align=right data-sort-value="0.77" | 770 m || 
|-id=099 bgcolor=#fefefe
| 531099 ||  || — || February 27, 2012 || Haleakala || Pan-STARRS ||  || align=right data-sort-value="0.64" | 640 m || 
|-id=100 bgcolor=#fefefe
| 531100 ||  || — || March 17, 2005 || Mount Lemmon || Mount Lemmon Survey ||  || align=right data-sort-value="0.76" | 760 m || 
|}

531101–531200 

|-bgcolor=#fefefe
| 531101 ||  || — || January 10, 2008 || Mount Lemmon || Mount Lemmon Survey ||  || align=right data-sort-value="0.59" | 590 m || 
|-id=102 bgcolor=#fefefe
| 531102 ||  || — || February 26, 2012 || Mount Lemmon || Mount Lemmon Survey ||  || align=right data-sort-value="0.62" | 620 m || 
|-id=103 bgcolor=#FA8072
| 531103 ||  || — || March 13, 2012 || Mount Lemmon || Mount Lemmon Survey || H || align=right data-sort-value="0.74" | 740 m || 
|-id=104 bgcolor=#fefefe
| 531104 ||  || — || February 10, 2008 || Kitt Peak || Spacewatch ||  || align=right data-sort-value="0.82" | 820 m || 
|-id=105 bgcolor=#FA8072
| 531105 ||  || — || May 10, 2005 || Socorro || LINEAR ||  || align=right data-sort-value="0.56" | 560 m || 
|-id=106 bgcolor=#fefefe
| 531106 ||  || — || May 8, 2005 || Kitt Peak || Spacewatch ||  || align=right data-sort-value="0.89" | 890 m || 
|-id=107 bgcolor=#fefefe
| 531107 ||  || — || March 13, 2012 || Mount Lemmon || Mount Lemmon Survey || H || align=right data-sort-value="0.63" | 630 m || 
|-id=108 bgcolor=#fefefe
| 531108 ||  || — || March 13, 2012 || Mount Lemmon || Mount Lemmon Survey ||  || align=right data-sort-value="0.58" | 580 m || 
|-id=109 bgcolor=#E9E9E9
| 531109 ||  || — || March 4, 2012 || Mount Lemmon || Mount Lemmon Survey ||  || align=right | 2.4 km || 
|-id=110 bgcolor=#fefefe
| 531110 ||  || — || March 1, 2012 || Mount Lemmon || Mount Lemmon Survey ||  || align=right data-sort-value="0.56" | 560 m || 
|-id=111 bgcolor=#E9E9E9
| 531111 ||  || — || March 14, 2012 || Mount Lemmon || Mount Lemmon Survey ||  || align=right | 1.9 km || 
|-id=112 bgcolor=#E9E9E9
| 531112 ||  || — || March 15, 2012 || Kitt Peak || Spacewatch ||  || align=right | 1.2 km || 
|-id=113 bgcolor=#fefefe
| 531113 ||  || — || March 15, 2012 || Mount Lemmon || Mount Lemmon Survey ||  || align=right data-sort-value="0.79" | 790 m || 
|-id=114 bgcolor=#fefefe
| 531114 ||  || — || March 1, 2012 || Mount Lemmon || Mount Lemmon Survey ||  || align=right data-sort-value="0.75" | 750 m || 
|-id=115 bgcolor=#fefefe
| 531115 ||  || — || February 24, 2012 || Haleakala || Pan-STARRS ||  || align=right data-sort-value="0.63" | 630 m || 
|-id=116 bgcolor=#fefefe
| 531116 ||  || — || February 2, 2005 || Kitt Peak || Spacewatch ||  || align=right data-sort-value="0.45" | 450 m || 
|-id=117 bgcolor=#fefefe
| 531117 ||  || — || February 19, 2012 || Kitt Peak || Spacewatch ||  || align=right data-sort-value="0.63" | 630 m || 
|-id=118 bgcolor=#E9E9E9
| 531118 ||  || — || February 27, 2012 || Haleakala || Pan-STARRS ||  || align=right | 1.2 km || 
|-id=119 bgcolor=#fefefe
| 531119 ||  || — || January 12, 2008 || Kitt Peak || Spacewatch ||  || align=right data-sort-value="0.64" | 640 m || 
|-id=120 bgcolor=#d6d6d6
| 531120 ||  || — || March 13, 2012 || Mount Lemmon || Mount Lemmon Survey || 3:2 || align=right | 3.2 km || 
|-id=121 bgcolor=#fefefe
| 531121 ||  || — || March 11, 2005 || Kitt Peak || Spacewatch || critical || align=right data-sort-value="0.62" | 620 m || 
|-id=122 bgcolor=#fefefe
| 531122 ||  || — || November 6, 2010 || Mount Lemmon || Mount Lemmon Survey || (2076) || align=right data-sort-value="0.72" | 720 m || 
|-id=123 bgcolor=#fefefe
| 531123 ||  || — || February 21, 2012 || Mount Lemmon || Mount Lemmon Survey || H || align=right data-sort-value="0.68" | 680 m || 
|-id=124 bgcolor=#fefefe
| 531124 ||  || — || February 1, 2008 || Mount Lemmon || Mount Lemmon Survey ||  || align=right data-sort-value="0.70" | 700 m || 
|-id=125 bgcolor=#E9E9E9
| 531125 ||  || — || August 19, 2009 || Kitt Peak || Spacewatch ||  || align=right | 1.6 km || 
|-id=126 bgcolor=#FA8072
| 531126 ||  || — || March 25, 2012 || Kitt Peak || Spacewatch ||  || align=right | 1.1 km || 
|-id=127 bgcolor=#fefefe
| 531127 ||  || — || December 16, 2007 || Kitt Peak || Spacewatch ||  || align=right data-sort-value="0.64" | 640 m || 
|-id=128 bgcolor=#fefefe
| 531128 ||  || — || February 27, 2012 || Haleakala || Pan-STARRS || H || align=right data-sort-value="0.57" | 570 m || 
|-id=129 bgcolor=#fefefe
| 531129 ||  || — || March 8, 2005 || Mount Lemmon || Mount Lemmon Survey ||  || align=right data-sort-value="0.59" | 590 m || 
|-id=130 bgcolor=#d6d6d6
| 531130 ||  || — || March 15, 2004 || Kitt Peak || Spacewatch || SHU3:2 || align=right | 4.5 km || 
|-id=131 bgcolor=#fefefe
| 531131 ||  || — || March 28, 2012 || Mount Lemmon || Mount Lemmon Survey || H || align=right data-sort-value="0.48" | 480 m || 
|-id=132 bgcolor=#fefefe
| 531132 ||  || — || April 2, 2005 || Mount Lemmon || Mount Lemmon Survey ||  || align=right data-sort-value="0.57" | 570 m || 
|-id=133 bgcolor=#E9E9E9
| 531133 ||  || — || March 21, 2012 || Mount Lemmon || Mount Lemmon Survey ||  || align=right | 1.5 km || 
|-id=134 bgcolor=#E9E9E9
| 531134 ||  || — || March 29, 2012 || Haleakala || Pan-STARRS ||  || align=right | 1.6 km || 
|-id=135 bgcolor=#E9E9E9
| 531135 ||  || — || February 27, 2012 || Haleakala || Pan-STARRS ||  || align=right | 2.1 km || 
|-id=136 bgcolor=#fefefe
| 531136 ||  || — || December 31, 2007 || Mount Lemmon || Mount Lemmon Survey || MAS || align=right data-sort-value="0.62" | 620 m || 
|-id=137 bgcolor=#E9E9E9
| 531137 ||  || — || March 15, 2008 || Mount Lemmon || Mount Lemmon Survey || ADE || align=right | 1.9 km || 
|-id=138 bgcolor=#E9E9E9
| 531138 ||  || — || March 28, 2012 || Haleakala || Pan-STARRS ||  || align=right | 1.1 km || 
|-id=139 bgcolor=#fefefe
| 531139 ||  || — || March 21, 2012 || Catalina || CSS ||  || align=right data-sort-value="0.63" | 630 m || 
|-id=140 bgcolor=#E9E9E9
| 531140 ||  || — || March 27, 2012 || Catalina || CSS ||  || align=right | 1.8 km || 
|-id=141 bgcolor=#C2E0FF
| 531141 ||  || — || April 21, 2011 || Haleakala || Pan-STARRS || other TNO || align=right | 222 km || 
|-id=142 bgcolor=#C2E0FF
| 531142 ||  || — || April 21, 2011 || Haleakala || Pan-STARRS || SDO || align=right | 193 km || 
|-id=143 bgcolor=#fefefe
| 531143 ||  || — || January 30, 2008 || Mount Lemmon || Mount Lemmon Survey ||  || align=right data-sort-value="0.65" | 650 m || 
|-id=144 bgcolor=#E9E9E9
| 531144 ||  || — || March 27, 2012 || Kitt Peak || Spacewatch ||  || align=right | 2.1 km || 
|-id=145 bgcolor=#E9E9E9
| 531145 ||  || — || April 3, 2008 || Mount Lemmon || Mount Lemmon Survey ||  || align=right | 1.4 km || 
|-id=146 bgcolor=#fefefe
| 531146 ||  || — || March 16, 2005 || Mount Lemmon || Mount Lemmon Survey ||  || align=right data-sort-value="0.57" | 570 m || 
|-id=147 bgcolor=#fefefe
| 531147 ||  || — || March 28, 2012 || Kitt Peak || Spacewatch ||  || align=right data-sort-value="0.75" | 750 m || 
|-id=148 bgcolor=#fefefe
| 531148 ||  || — || March 16, 2012 || Mount Lemmon || Mount Lemmon Survey ||  || align=right data-sort-value="0.63" | 630 m || 
|-id=149 bgcolor=#fefefe
| 531149 ||  || — || March 24, 2012 || Kitt Peak || Spacewatch ||  || align=right data-sort-value="0.71" | 710 m || 
|-id=150 bgcolor=#FA8072
| 531150 ||  || — || January 19, 2012 || Haleakala || Pan-STARRS ||  || align=right data-sort-value="0.46" | 460 m || 
|-id=151 bgcolor=#fefefe
| 531151 ||  || — || March 28, 2012 || Kitt Peak || Spacewatch || H || align=right data-sort-value="0.66" | 660 m || 
|-id=152 bgcolor=#fefefe
| 531152 ||  || — || March 4, 2012 || Mount Lemmon || Mount Lemmon Survey ||  || align=right data-sort-value="0.71" | 710 m || 
|-id=153 bgcolor=#fefefe
| 531153 ||  || — || February 11, 2008 || Mount Lemmon || Mount Lemmon Survey || MAS || align=right data-sort-value="0.66" | 660 m || 
|-id=154 bgcolor=#fefefe
| 531154 ||  || — || January 19, 2008 || Mount Lemmon || Mount Lemmon Survey || (5026) || align=right data-sort-value="0.76" | 760 m || 
|-id=155 bgcolor=#fefefe
| 531155 ||  || — || February 24, 2008 || Mount Lemmon || Mount Lemmon Survey || NYS || align=right data-sort-value="0.58" | 580 m || 
|-id=156 bgcolor=#fefefe
| 531156 ||  || — || March 29, 2012 || Mount Lemmon || Mount Lemmon Survey ||  || align=right data-sort-value="0.83" | 830 m || 
|-id=157 bgcolor=#fefefe
| 531157 ||  || — || October 12, 2010 || Catalina || CSS || H || align=right data-sort-value="0.56" | 560 m || 
|-id=158 bgcolor=#fefefe
| 531158 ||  || — || March 23, 2012 || Catalina || CSS ||  || align=right data-sort-value="0.85" | 850 m || 
|-id=159 bgcolor=#d6d6d6
| 531159 ||  || — || January 28, 2006 || Catalina || CSS ||  || align=right | 2.9 km || 
|-id=160 bgcolor=#fefefe
| 531160 ||  || — || April 15, 2012 || Haleakala || Pan-STARRS ||  || align=right data-sort-value="0.59" | 590 m || 
|-id=161 bgcolor=#E9E9E9
| 531161 ||  || — || March 27, 2012 || Mount Lemmon || Mount Lemmon Survey ||  || align=right | 1.6 km || 
|-id=162 bgcolor=#fefefe
| 531162 ||  || — || February 12, 2008 || Kitt Peak || Spacewatch || MAS || align=right data-sort-value="0.61" | 610 m || 
|-id=163 bgcolor=#E9E9E9
| 531163 ||  || — || March 28, 2012 || Kitt Peak || Spacewatch ||  || align=right data-sort-value="0.89" | 890 m || 
|-id=164 bgcolor=#fefefe
| 531164 ||  || — || March 27, 2012 || Mount Lemmon || Mount Lemmon Survey ||  || align=right data-sort-value="0.75" | 750 m || 
|-id=165 bgcolor=#fefefe
| 531165 ||  || — || January 5, 2012 || Haleakala || Pan-STARRS ||  || align=right data-sort-value="0.65" | 650 m || 
|-id=166 bgcolor=#d6d6d6
| 531166 ||  || — || January 30, 2011 || Haleakala || Pan-STARRS || 3:2 || align=right | 3.4 km || 
|-id=167 bgcolor=#E9E9E9
| 531167 ||  || — || March 14, 2012 || Kitt Peak || Spacewatch ||  || align=right data-sort-value="0.84" | 840 m || 
|-id=168 bgcolor=#E9E9E9
| 531168 ||  || — || November 22, 2009 || Mount Lemmon || Mount Lemmon Survey ||  || align=right | 2.0 km || 
|-id=169 bgcolor=#fefefe
| 531169 ||  || — || February 11, 2008 || Kitt Peak || Spacewatch ||  || align=right data-sort-value="0.56" | 560 m || 
|-id=170 bgcolor=#fefefe
| 531170 ||  || — || November 14, 2010 || Mount Lemmon || Mount Lemmon Survey ||  || align=right data-sort-value="0.62" | 620 m || 
|-id=171 bgcolor=#fefefe
| 531171 ||  || — || December 18, 2007 || Kitt Peak || Spacewatch || NYS || align=right data-sort-value="0.47" | 470 m || 
|-id=172 bgcolor=#E9E9E9
| 531172 ||  || — || March 15, 2012 || Haleakala || Pan-STARRS ||  || align=right | 2.3 km || 
|-id=173 bgcolor=#fefefe
| 531173 ||  || — || January 15, 2008 || Mount Lemmon || Mount Lemmon Survey ||  || align=right data-sort-value="0.70" | 700 m || 
|-id=174 bgcolor=#E9E9E9
| 531174 ||  || — || April 15, 2012 || Haleakala || Pan-STARRS ||  || align=right | 1.6 km || 
|-id=175 bgcolor=#fefefe
| 531175 ||  || — || April 15, 2012 || Haleakala || Pan-STARRS ||  || align=right data-sort-value="0.58" | 580 m || 
|-id=176 bgcolor=#fefefe
| 531176 ||  || — || April 15, 2012 || Catalina || CSS ||  || align=right data-sort-value="0.86" | 860 m || 
|-id=177 bgcolor=#fefefe
| 531177 ||  || — || October 25, 2003 || Kitt Peak || Spacewatch ||  || align=right | 1.0 km || 
|-id=178 bgcolor=#FA8072
| 531178 ||  || — || March 26, 2012 || Mount Lemmon || Mount Lemmon Survey ||  || align=right data-sort-value="0.63" | 630 m || 
|-id=179 bgcolor=#fefefe
| 531179 ||  || — || October 11, 2010 || Mount Lemmon || Mount Lemmon Survey || H || align=right data-sort-value="0.59" | 590 m || 
|-id=180 bgcolor=#E9E9E9
| 531180 ||  || — || January 14, 2011 || Kitt Peak || Spacewatch ||  || align=right | 1.7 km || 
|-id=181 bgcolor=#E9E9E9
| 531181 ||  || — || April 1, 2012 || Mount Lemmon || Mount Lemmon Survey ||  || align=right | 2.1 km || 
|-id=182 bgcolor=#fefefe
| 531182 ||  || — || April 15, 2012 || Haleakala || Pan-STARRS || H || align=right data-sort-value="0.45" | 450 m || 
|-id=183 bgcolor=#fefefe
| 531183 ||  || — || April 15, 2012 || Haleakala || Pan-STARRS ||  || align=right | 1.0 km || 
|-id=184 bgcolor=#fefefe
| 531184 ||  || — || October 7, 2010 || Catalina || CSS || H || align=right data-sort-value="0.74" | 740 m || 
|-id=185 bgcolor=#fefefe
| 531185 ||  || — || March 15, 2012 || Kitt Peak || Spacewatch || H || align=right data-sort-value="0.59" | 590 m || 
|-id=186 bgcolor=#E9E9E9
| 531186 ||  || — || April 17, 2012 || Kitt Peak || Spacewatch ||  || align=right | 1.8 km || 
|-id=187 bgcolor=#fefefe
| 531187 ||  || — || March 23, 2012 || Kitt Peak || Spacewatch || H || align=right data-sort-value="0.58" | 580 m || 
|-id=188 bgcolor=#fefefe
| 531188 ||  || — || April 4, 2005 || Mount Lemmon || Mount Lemmon Survey ||  || align=right data-sort-value="0.68" | 680 m || 
|-id=189 bgcolor=#FA8072
| 531189 ||  || — || April 21, 2012 || Haleakala || Pan-STARRS || H || align=right data-sort-value="0.49" | 490 m || 
|-id=190 bgcolor=#FA8072
| 531190 ||  || — || April 25, 2007 || Kitt Peak || Spacewatch || H || align=right data-sort-value="0.60" | 600 m || 
|-id=191 bgcolor=#fefefe
| 531191 ||  || — || April 21, 2012 || Mount Lemmon || Mount Lemmon Survey ||  || align=right data-sort-value="0.58" | 580 m || 
|-id=192 bgcolor=#fefefe
| 531192 ||  || — || April 25, 2012 || Mount Lemmon || Mount Lemmon Survey || H || align=right data-sort-value="0.58" | 580 m || 
|-id=193 bgcolor=#d6d6d6
| 531193 ||  || — || March 27, 2012 || Mount Lemmon || Mount Lemmon Survey ||  || align=right | 2.9 km || 
|-id=194 bgcolor=#E9E9E9
| 531194 ||  || — || April 23, 2012 || Kitt Peak || Spacewatch ||  || align=right data-sort-value="0.82" | 820 m || 
|-id=195 bgcolor=#fefefe
| 531195 ||  || — || March 28, 2012 || Mount Lemmon || Mount Lemmon Survey || MAS || align=right data-sort-value="0.57" | 570 m || 
|-id=196 bgcolor=#E9E9E9
| 531196 ||  || — || April 12, 2008 || Catalina || CSS ||  || align=right | 1.9 km || 
|-id=197 bgcolor=#fefefe
| 531197 ||  || — || December 19, 2007 || Mount Lemmon || Mount Lemmon Survey ||  || align=right data-sort-value="0.76" | 760 m || 
|-id=198 bgcolor=#fefefe
| 531198 ||  || — || February 8, 2008 || Kitt Peak || Spacewatch || NYS || align=right data-sort-value="0.55" | 550 m || 
|-id=199 bgcolor=#d6d6d6
| 531199 ||  || — || April 24, 2012 || Catalina || CSS ||  || align=right | 2.7 km || 
|-id=200 bgcolor=#fefefe
| 531200 ||  || — || April 13, 2004 || Kitt Peak || Spacewatch || H || align=right data-sort-value="0.53" | 530 m || 
|}

531201–531300 

|-bgcolor=#fefefe
| 531201 ||  || — || March 16, 2012 || Kitt Peak || Spacewatch || NYS || align=right data-sort-value="0.52" | 520 m || 
|-id=202 bgcolor=#fefefe
| 531202 ||  || — || March 4, 2012 || Mount Lemmon || Mount Lemmon Survey ||  || align=right data-sort-value="0.59" | 590 m || 
|-id=203 bgcolor=#E9E9E9
| 531203 ||  || — || April 15, 2012 || Haleakala || Pan-STARRS ||  || align=right | 1.7 km || 
|-id=204 bgcolor=#E9E9E9
| 531204 ||  || — || November 20, 2009 || La Sagra || OAM Obs. ||  || align=right | 3.1 km || 
|-id=205 bgcolor=#fefefe
| 531205 ||  || — || March 17, 2005 || Mount Lemmon || Mount Lemmon Survey ||  || align=right data-sort-value="0.72" | 720 m || 
|-id=206 bgcolor=#E9E9E9
| 531206 ||  || — || April 27, 2012 || Haleakala || Pan-STARRS ||  || align=right | 1.6 km || 
|-id=207 bgcolor=#fefefe
| 531207 ||  || — || January 2, 2012 || Mount Lemmon || Mount Lemmon Survey ||  || align=right data-sort-value="0.62" | 620 m || 
|-id=208 bgcolor=#fefefe
| 531208 ||  || — || March 15, 2012 || Haleakala || Pan-STARRS || H || align=right data-sort-value="0.68" | 680 m || 
|-id=209 bgcolor=#fefefe
| 531209 ||  || — || January 18, 2008 || Kitt Peak || Spacewatch ||  || align=right data-sort-value="0.62" | 620 m || 
|-id=210 bgcolor=#fefefe
| 531210 ||  || — || March 8, 2008 || Mount Lemmon || Mount Lemmon Survey || MAS || align=right data-sort-value="0.67" | 670 m || 
|-id=211 bgcolor=#E9E9E9
| 531211 ||  || — || April 8, 2003 || Kitt Peak || Spacewatch ||  || align=right | 1.6 km || 
|-id=212 bgcolor=#E9E9E9
| 531212 ||  || — || April 19, 2012 || Mount Lemmon || Mount Lemmon Survey ||  || align=right | 1.2 km || 
|-id=213 bgcolor=#E9E9E9
| 531213 ||  || — || March 29, 2012 || Kitt Peak || Spacewatch ||  || align=right | 1.9 km || 
|-id=214 bgcolor=#E9E9E9
| 531214 ||  || — || January 3, 2012 || Mount Lemmon || Mount Lemmon Survey ||  || align=right | 1.3 km || 
|-id=215 bgcolor=#fefefe
| 531215 ||  || — || April 24, 2012 || Mount Lemmon || Mount Lemmon Survey || NYS || align=right data-sort-value="0.48" | 480 m || 
|-id=216 bgcolor=#fefefe
| 531216 ||  || — || November 22, 2005 || Catalina || CSS || H || align=right data-sort-value="0.77" | 770 m || 
|-id=217 bgcolor=#fefefe
| 531217 ||  || — || November 10, 2010 || Mount Lemmon || Mount Lemmon Survey ||  || align=right data-sort-value="0.59" | 590 m || 
|-id=218 bgcolor=#fefefe
| 531218 ||  || — || April 21, 2012 || Mount Lemmon || Mount Lemmon Survey ||  || align=right data-sort-value="0.95" | 950 m || 
|-id=219 bgcolor=#E9E9E9
| 531219 ||  || — || April 28, 2012 || Kitt Peak || Spacewatch ||  || align=right | 2.2 km || 
|-id=220 bgcolor=#fefefe
| 531220 ||  || — || April 21, 2012 || Mount Lemmon || Mount Lemmon Survey ||  || align=right data-sort-value="0.66" | 660 m || 
|-id=221 bgcolor=#FA8072
| 531221 ||  || — || April 24, 2012 || Haleakala || Pan-STARRS ||  || align=right data-sort-value="0.72" | 720 m || 
|-id=222 bgcolor=#fefefe
| 531222 ||  || — || January 11, 2008 || Mount Lemmon || Mount Lemmon Survey || PHO || align=right data-sort-value="0.65" | 650 m || 
|-id=223 bgcolor=#fefefe
| 531223 ||  || — || March 21, 2009 || Mount Lemmon || Mount Lemmon Survey || H || align=right data-sort-value="0.72" | 720 m || 
|-id=224 bgcolor=#C2E0FF
| 531224 ||  || — || April 27, 2012 || Haleakala || Pan-STARRS || SDOcritical || align=right | 191 km || 
|-id=225 bgcolor=#fefefe
| 531225 ||  || — || February 28, 2008 || Mount Lemmon || Mount Lemmon Survey ||  || align=right data-sort-value="0.68" | 680 m || 
|-id=226 bgcolor=#fefefe
| 531226 ||  || — || February 9, 2008 || Kitt Peak || Spacewatch ||  || align=right data-sort-value="0.76" | 760 m || 
|-id=227 bgcolor=#E9E9E9
| 531227 ||  || — || April 19, 2012 || Mount Lemmon || Mount Lemmon Survey ||  || align=right | 1.0 km || 
|-id=228 bgcolor=#fefefe
| 531228 ||  || — || April 29, 2012 || Kitt Peak || Spacewatch ||  || align=right data-sort-value="0.75" | 750 m || 
|-id=229 bgcolor=#E9E9E9
| 531229 ||  || — || April 30, 2012 || Kitt Peak || Spacewatch ||  || align=right | 1.5 km || 
|-id=230 bgcolor=#fefefe
| 531230 ||  || — || April 19, 2012 || Mount Lemmon || Mount Lemmon Survey ||  || align=right data-sort-value="0.59" | 590 m || 
|-id=231 bgcolor=#fefefe
| 531231 ||  || — || April 19, 2012 || Mount Lemmon || Mount Lemmon Survey ||  || align=right data-sort-value="0.82" | 820 m || 
|-id=232 bgcolor=#fefefe
| 531232 ||  || — || April 27, 2012 || Haleakala || Pan-STARRS ||  || align=right data-sort-value="0.78" | 780 m || 
|-id=233 bgcolor=#fefefe
| 531233 ||  || — || May 9, 2012 || Haleakala || Pan-STARRS || H || align=right data-sort-value="0.61" | 610 m || 
|-id=234 bgcolor=#fefefe
| 531234 ||  || — || April 18, 2012 || Kitt Peak || Spacewatch || H || align=right data-sort-value="0.49" | 490 m || 
|-id=235 bgcolor=#fefefe
| 531235 ||  || — || April 27, 2012 || Haleakala || Pan-STARRS ||  || align=right data-sort-value="0.62" | 620 m || 
|-id=236 bgcolor=#fefefe
| 531236 ||  || — || April 11, 2005 || Mount Lemmon || Mount Lemmon Survey ||  || align=right data-sort-value="0.57" | 570 m || 
|-id=237 bgcolor=#fefefe
| 531237 ||  || — || February 8, 2008 || Kitt Peak || Spacewatch ||  || align=right data-sort-value="0.65" | 650 m || 
|-id=238 bgcolor=#E9E9E9
| 531238 ||  || — || February 4, 2011 || Haleakala || Pan-STARRS ||  || align=right | 2.5 km || 
|-id=239 bgcolor=#E9E9E9
| 531239 ||  || — || May 12, 2012 || Mount Lemmon || Mount Lemmon Survey ||  || align=right data-sort-value="0.91" | 910 m || 
|-id=240 bgcolor=#fefefe
| 531240 ||  || — || May 12, 2012 || Mount Lemmon || Mount Lemmon Survey ||  || align=right data-sort-value="0.60" | 600 m || 
|-id=241 bgcolor=#fefefe
| 531241 ||  || — || October 28, 2006 || Mount Lemmon || Mount Lemmon Survey ||  || align=right data-sort-value="0.70" | 700 m || 
|-id=242 bgcolor=#fefefe
| 531242 ||  || — || November 28, 2010 || Mount Lemmon || Mount Lemmon Survey || H || align=right data-sort-value="0.66" | 660 m || 
|-id=243 bgcolor=#E9E9E9
| 531243 ||  || — || May 1, 2012 || Mount Lemmon || Mount Lemmon Survey ||  || align=right | 1.9 km || 
|-id=244 bgcolor=#E9E9E9
| 531244 ||  || — || April 16, 2012 || Catalina || CSS ||  || align=right | 1.9 km || 
|-id=245 bgcolor=#fefefe
| 531245 ||  || — || April 7, 2008 || Kitt Peak || Spacewatch ||  || align=right data-sort-value="0.78" | 780 m || 
|-id=246 bgcolor=#fefefe
| 531246 ||  || — || February 9, 2008 || Mount Lemmon || Mount Lemmon Survey ||  || align=right data-sort-value="0.60" | 600 m || 
|-id=247 bgcolor=#fefefe
| 531247 ||  || — || March 9, 2008 || Mount Lemmon || Mount Lemmon Survey ||  || align=right data-sort-value="0.64" | 640 m || 
|-id=248 bgcolor=#fefefe
| 531248 ||  || — || May 15, 2012 || Haleakala || Pan-STARRS || H || align=right data-sort-value="0.63" | 630 m || 
|-id=249 bgcolor=#fefefe
| 531249 ||  || — || April 27, 2012 || Haleakala || Pan-STARRS || H || align=right data-sort-value="0.56" | 560 m || 
|-id=250 bgcolor=#E9E9E9
| 531250 ||  || — || February 7, 2011 || Mount Lemmon || Mount Lemmon Survey ||  || align=right | 2.4 km || 
|-id=251 bgcolor=#d6d6d6
| 531251 ||  || — || March 16, 2012 || Mount Lemmon || Mount Lemmon Survey ||  || align=right | 3.1 km || 
|-id=252 bgcolor=#fefefe
| 531252 ||  || — || May 14, 2012 || Catalina || CSS || H || align=right data-sort-value="0.87" | 870 m || 
|-id=253 bgcolor=#d6d6d6
| 531253 ||  || — || May 12, 2012 || Mount Lemmon || Mount Lemmon Survey || 3:2 || align=right | 4.2 km || 
|-id=254 bgcolor=#fefefe
| 531254 ||  || — || February 3, 2000 || Kitt Peak || Spacewatch ||  || align=right data-sort-value="0.81" | 810 m || 
|-id=255 bgcolor=#fefefe
| 531255 ||  || — || May 10, 2012 || Siding Spring || SSS ||  || align=right | 1.0 km || 
|-id=256 bgcolor=#E9E9E9
| 531256 ||  || — || May 14, 2012 || Haleakala || Pan-STARRS ||  || align=right data-sort-value="0.86" | 860 m || 
|-id=257 bgcolor=#fefefe
| 531257 ||  || — || April 25, 2012 || Mount Lemmon || Mount Lemmon Survey || H || align=right data-sort-value="0.54" | 540 m || 
|-id=258 bgcolor=#fefefe
| 531258 ||  || — || November 29, 2010 || Kitt Peak || Spacewatch || H || align=right data-sort-value="0.35" | 350 m || 
|-id=259 bgcolor=#fefefe
| 531259 ||  || — || May 19, 2012 || Haleakala || Pan-STARRS || H || align=right data-sort-value="0.79" | 790 m || 
|-id=260 bgcolor=#fefefe
| 531260 ||  || — || May 26, 2007 || Mount Lemmon || Mount Lemmon Survey || H || align=right data-sort-value="0.47" | 470 m || 
|-id=261 bgcolor=#E9E9E9
| 531261 ||  || — || April 1, 2012 || Mount Lemmon || Mount Lemmon Survey ||  || align=right | 2.1 km || 
|-id=262 bgcolor=#fefefe
| 531262 ||  || — || April 15, 2012 || Haleakala || Pan-STARRS ||  || align=right data-sort-value="0.91" | 910 m || 
|-id=263 bgcolor=#fefefe
| 531263 ||  || — || May 15, 2009 || Mount Lemmon || Mount Lemmon Survey || H || align=right data-sort-value="0.62" | 620 m || 
|-id=264 bgcolor=#E9E9E9
| 531264 ||  || — || March 29, 2012 || Kitt Peak || Spacewatch ||  || align=right | 1.8 km || 
|-id=265 bgcolor=#E9E9E9
| 531265 ||  || — || May 14, 2012 || Haleakala || Pan-STARRS || DOR || align=right | 2.1 km || 
|-id=266 bgcolor=#fefefe
| 531266 ||  || — || April 27, 2012 || Haleakala || Pan-STARRS ||  || align=right data-sort-value="0.58" | 580 m || 
|-id=267 bgcolor=#E9E9E9
| 531267 ||  || — || February 25, 2007 || Kitt Peak || Spacewatch ||  || align=right | 1.3 km || 
|-id=268 bgcolor=#E9E9E9
| 531268 ||  || — || May 21, 2012 || Haleakala || Pan-STARRS ||  || align=right | 1.4 km || 
|-id=269 bgcolor=#fefefe
| 531269 ||  || — || April 8, 2008 || Kitt Peak || Spacewatch || NYS || align=right data-sort-value="0.58" | 580 m || 
|-id=270 bgcolor=#E9E9E9
| 531270 ||  || — || May 31, 2012 || Mount Lemmon || Mount Lemmon Survey ||  || align=right | 1.2 km || 
|-id=271 bgcolor=#fefefe
| 531271 ||  || — || May 16, 2012 || Haleakala || Pan-STARRS || H || align=right data-sort-value="0.60" | 600 m || 
|-id=272 bgcolor=#fefefe
| 531272 ||  || — || April 8, 2008 || Mount Lemmon || Mount Lemmon Survey || NYS || align=right data-sort-value="0.63" | 630 m || 
|-id=273 bgcolor=#fefefe
| 531273 ||  || — || June 15, 2012 || Mount Lemmon || Mount Lemmon Survey ||  || align=right data-sort-value="0.75" | 750 m || 
|-id=274 bgcolor=#E9E9E9
| 531274 ||  || — || May 21, 2012 || Haleakala || Pan-STARRS ||  || align=right | 2.0 km || 
|-id=275 bgcolor=#d6d6d6
| 531275 ||  || — || December 15, 2001 || Socorro || LINEAR ||  || align=right | 3.7 km || 
|-id=276 bgcolor=#d6d6d6
| 531276 ||  || — || May 30, 2012 || Mount Lemmon || Mount Lemmon Survey ||  || align=right | 3.1 km || 
|-id=277 bgcolor=#FFC2E0
| 531277 ||  || — || June 24, 2012 || Socorro || LINEAR || APOPHA || align=right data-sort-value="0.32" | 320 m || 
|-id=278 bgcolor=#d6d6d6
| 531278 ||  || — || April 8, 2006 || Mount Lemmon || Mount Lemmon Survey ||  || align=right | 2.6 km || 
|-id=279 bgcolor=#fefefe
| 531279 ||  || — || June 16, 2012 || Haleakala || Pan-STARRS || H || align=right data-sort-value="0.73" | 730 m || 
|-id=280 bgcolor=#fefefe
| 531280 ||  || — || December 5, 2005 || Kitt Peak || Spacewatch ||  || align=right data-sort-value="0.88" | 880 m || 
|-id=281 bgcolor=#E9E9E9
| 531281 ||  || — || June 19, 2012 || Kitt Peak || Spacewatch ||  || align=right | 1.5 km || 
|-id=282 bgcolor=#fefefe
| 531282 ||  || — || September 5, 2007 || Anderson Mesa || LONEOS || H || align=right data-sort-value="0.81" | 810 m || 
|-id=283 bgcolor=#E9E9E9
| 531283 ||  || — || March 30, 2011 || Haleakala || Pan-STARRS ||  || align=right | 1.5 km || 
|-id=284 bgcolor=#d6d6d6
| 531284 ||  || — || May 21, 2006 || Kitt Peak || Spacewatch ||  || align=right | 2.2 km || 
|-id=285 bgcolor=#d6d6d6
| 531285 ||  || — || May 1, 2006 || Kitt Peak || Spacewatch ||  || align=right | 2.4 km || 
|-id=286 bgcolor=#fefefe
| 531286 ||  || — || November 5, 2010 || Kitt Peak || Spacewatch || H || align=right data-sort-value="0.85" | 850 m || 
|-id=287 bgcolor=#fefefe
| 531287 ||  || — || July 28, 2012 || Haleakala || Pan-STARRS ||  || align=right data-sort-value="0.84" | 840 m || 
|-id=288 bgcolor=#fefefe
| 531288 ||  || — || January 30, 2011 || Haleakala || Pan-STARRS || H || align=right data-sort-value="0.51" | 510 m || 
|-id=289 bgcolor=#fefefe
| 531289 ||  || — || August 8, 2012 || Haleakala || Pan-STARRS || H || align=right data-sort-value="0.54" | 540 m || 
|-id=290 bgcolor=#d6d6d6
| 531290 ||  || — || June 3, 2010 || WISE || WISE ||  || align=right | 3.9 km || 
|-id=291 bgcolor=#d6d6d6
| 531291 ||  || — || August 8, 2012 || Haleakala || Pan-STARRS || EOS || align=right | 2.2 km || 
|-id=292 bgcolor=#fefefe
| 531292 ||  || — || January 10, 2011 || Mount Lemmon || Mount Lemmon Survey || H || align=right data-sort-value="0.68" | 680 m || 
|-id=293 bgcolor=#d6d6d6
| 531293 ||  || — || August 8, 2012 || Haleakala || Pan-STARRS ||  || align=right | 2.5 km || 
|-id=294 bgcolor=#d6d6d6
| 531294 ||  || — || August 9, 2012 || Haleakala || Pan-STARRS ||  || align=right | 2.4 km || 
|-id=295 bgcolor=#d6d6d6
| 531295 ||  || — || September 26, 2006 || Kitt Peak || Spacewatch ||  || align=right | 2.7 km || 
|-id=296 bgcolor=#d6d6d6
| 531296 ||  || — || November 2, 2007 || Mount Lemmon || Mount Lemmon Survey ||  || align=right | 1.9 km || 
|-id=297 bgcolor=#fefefe
| 531297 ||  || — || May 20, 2012 || Mount Lemmon || Mount Lemmon Survey || H || align=right data-sort-value="0.74" | 740 m || 
|-id=298 bgcolor=#fefefe
| 531298 ||  || — || April 6, 2010 || WISE || WISE ||  || align=right | 1.3 km || 
|-id=299 bgcolor=#d6d6d6
| 531299 ||  || — || August 6, 2012 || Haleakala || Pan-STARRS ||  || align=right | 2.5 km || 
|-id=300 bgcolor=#d6d6d6
| 531300 ||  || — || August 6, 2012 || Haleakala || Pan-STARRS ||  || align=right | 2.4 km || 
|}

531301–531400 

|-bgcolor=#fefefe
| 531301 ||  || — || August 14, 2012 || Haleakala || Pan-STARRS ||  || align=right data-sort-value="0.75" | 750 m || 
|-id=302 bgcolor=#E9E9E9
| 531302 ||  || — || March 21, 2010 || WISE || WISE ||  || align=right | 1.7 km || 
|-id=303 bgcolor=#d6d6d6
| 531303 ||  || — || October 9, 2007 || Catalina || CSS ||  || align=right | 4.5 km || 
|-id=304 bgcolor=#fefefe
| 531304 ||  || — || January 7, 2006 || Kitt Peak || Spacewatch || H || align=right data-sort-value="0.76" | 760 m || 
|-id=305 bgcolor=#d6d6d6
| 531305 ||  || — || December 22, 2008 || Kitt Peak || Spacewatch ||  || align=right | 2.7 km || 
|-id=306 bgcolor=#d6d6d6
| 531306 ||  || — || August 14, 2012 || Haleakala || Pan-STARRS ||  || align=right | 3.3 km || 
|-id=307 bgcolor=#d6d6d6
| 531307 ||  || — || March 13, 2005 || Kitt Peak || Spacewatch ||  || align=right | 2.9 km || 
|-id=308 bgcolor=#d6d6d6
| 531308 ||  || — || August 14, 2012 || Haleakala || Pan-STARRS ||  || align=right | 2.5 km || 
|-id=309 bgcolor=#d6d6d6
| 531309 ||  || — || August 13, 2012 || Kitt Peak || Spacewatch ||  || align=right | 2.9 km || 
|-id=310 bgcolor=#E9E9E9
| 531310 ||  || — || September 28, 2003 || Kitt Peak || Spacewatch ||  || align=right | 2.3 km || 
|-id=311 bgcolor=#d6d6d6
| 531311 ||  || — || March 19, 2010 || Mount Lemmon || Mount Lemmon Survey ||  || align=right | 2.8 km || 
|-id=312 bgcolor=#E9E9E9
| 531312 ||  || — || August 11, 2012 || Siding Spring || SSS ||  || align=right | 1.8 km || 
|-id=313 bgcolor=#d6d6d6
| 531313 ||  || — || August 14, 2012 || Haleakala || Pan-STARRS ||  || align=right | 2.5 km || 
|-id=314 bgcolor=#fefefe
| 531314 ||  || — || July 18, 2007 || Mount Lemmon || Mount Lemmon Survey || H || align=right data-sort-value="0.68" | 680 m || 
|-id=315 bgcolor=#d6d6d6
| 531315 ||  || — || August 13, 2012 || Haleakala || Pan-STARRS ||  || align=right | 2.1 km || 
|-id=316 bgcolor=#d6d6d6
| 531316 ||  || — || January 28, 2009 || Catalina || CSS ||  || align=right | 5.3 km || 
|-id=317 bgcolor=#d6d6d6
| 531317 ||  || — || September 13, 2007 || Mount Lemmon || Mount Lemmon Survey ||  || align=right | 3.0 km || 
|-id=318 bgcolor=#d6d6d6
| 531318 ||  || — || May 29, 2012 || Mount Lemmon || Mount Lemmon Survey || Tj (2.97) || align=right | 3.8 km || 
|-id=319 bgcolor=#d6d6d6
| 531319 ||  || — || January 3, 2009 || Mount Lemmon || Mount Lemmon Survey ||  || align=right | 2.8 km || 
|-id=320 bgcolor=#E9E9E9
| 531320 ||  || — || August 17, 2012 || Haleakala || Pan-STARRS ||  || align=right | 2.3 km || 
|-id=321 bgcolor=#d6d6d6
| 531321 ||  || — || August 22, 2012 || La Sagra || OAM Obs. ||  || align=right | 4.1 km || 
|-id=322 bgcolor=#E9E9E9
| 531322 ||  || — || March 12, 2007 || Kitt Peak || Spacewatch ||  || align=right data-sort-value="0.78" | 780 m || 
|-id=323 bgcolor=#d6d6d6
| 531323 ||  || — || June 5, 2010 || WISE || WISE ||  || align=right | 2.4 km || 
|-id=324 bgcolor=#E9E9E9
| 531324 ||  || — || August 6, 2012 || Haleakala || Pan-STARRS ||  || align=right | 1.9 km || 
|-id=325 bgcolor=#E9E9E9
| 531325 ||  || — || August 14, 2012 || Kitt Peak || Spacewatch ||  || align=right data-sort-value="0.94" | 940 m || 
|-id=326 bgcolor=#d6d6d6
| 531326 ||  || — || October 12, 2007 || Mount Lemmon || Mount Lemmon Survey ||  || align=right | 2.3 km || 
|-id=327 bgcolor=#C2FFFF
| 531327 ||  || — || August 24, 2012 || Kitt Peak || Spacewatch || L5 || align=right | 6.5 km || 
|-id=328 bgcolor=#d6d6d6
| 531328 ||  || — || August 24, 2012 || Kitt Peak || Spacewatch ||  || align=right | 2.4 km || 
|-id=329 bgcolor=#d6d6d6
| 531329 ||  || — || February 5, 2009 || Kitt Peak || Spacewatch || VER || align=right | 2.4 km || 
|-id=330 bgcolor=#fefefe
| 531330 ||  || — || June 21, 2012 || Mount Lemmon || Mount Lemmon Survey || H || align=right data-sort-value="0.57" | 570 m || 
|-id=331 bgcolor=#d6d6d6
| 531331 ||  || — || August 17, 2012 || Haleakala || Pan-STARRS ||  || align=right | 2.7 km || 
|-id=332 bgcolor=#C2FFFF
| 531332 ||  || — || October 3, 2013 || Haleakala || Pan-STARRS || L5 || align=right | 5.8 km || 
|-id=333 bgcolor=#d6d6d6
| 531333 ||  || — || August 16, 2012 || Haleakala || Pan-STARRS ||  || align=right | 2.6 km || 
|-id=334 bgcolor=#d6d6d6
| 531334 ||  || — || October 23, 1997 || Kitt Peak || Spacewatch ||  || align=right | 2.2 km || 
|-id=335 bgcolor=#d6d6d6
| 531335 ||  || — || September 9, 2007 || Mount Lemmon || Mount Lemmon Survey ||  || align=right | 2.4 km || 
|-id=336 bgcolor=#E9E9E9
| 531336 ||  || — || September 29, 2003 || Kitt Peak || Spacewatch ||  || align=right | 1.9 km || 
|-id=337 bgcolor=#d6d6d6
| 531337 ||  || — || August 25, 2012 || Haleakala || Pan-STARRS ||  || align=right | 3.0 km || 
|-id=338 bgcolor=#E9E9E9
| 531338 ||  || — || August 25, 2012 || Haleakala || Pan-STARRS ||  || align=right | 2.4 km || 
|-id=339 bgcolor=#E9E9E9
| 531339 ||  || — || October 22, 2008 || Mount Lemmon || Mount Lemmon Survey ||  || align=right | 1.4 km || 
|-id=340 bgcolor=#d6d6d6
| 531340 ||  || — || August 26, 2012 || Kitt Peak || Spacewatch ||  || align=right | 2.1 km || 
|-id=341 bgcolor=#d6d6d6
| 531341 ||  || — || August 26, 2012 || Haleakala || Pan-STARRS ||  || align=right | 2.3 km || 
|-id=342 bgcolor=#d6d6d6
| 531342 ||  || — || August 26, 2012 || Haleakala || Pan-STARRS ||  || align=right | 2.9 km || 
|-id=343 bgcolor=#fefefe
| 531343 ||  || — || July 18, 2012 || Catalina || CSS || H || align=right data-sort-value="0.71" | 710 m || 
|-id=344 bgcolor=#d6d6d6
| 531344 ||  || — || October 15, 2001 || Socorro || LINEAR ||  || align=right | 3.0 km || 
|-id=345 bgcolor=#d6d6d6
| 531345 ||  || — || October 9, 2007 || Kitt Peak || Spacewatch ||  || align=right | 2.4 km || 
|-id=346 bgcolor=#fefefe
| 531346 ||  || — || December 9, 2010 || Mount Lemmon || Mount Lemmon Survey || H || align=right data-sort-value="0.58" | 580 m || 
|-id=347 bgcolor=#d6d6d6
| 531347 ||  || — || August 14, 2012 || Kitt Peak || Spacewatch ||  || align=right | 2.4 km || 
|-id=348 bgcolor=#d6d6d6
| 531348 ||  || — || August 28, 2012 || Mount Lemmon || Mount Lemmon Survey ||  || align=right | 3.1 km || 
|-id=349 bgcolor=#d6d6d6
| 531349 ||  || — || August 25, 2012 || Haleakala || Pan-STARRS || TIR || align=right | 2.9 km || 
|-id=350 bgcolor=#E9E9E9
| 531350 ||  || — || January 22, 2010 || Siding Spring || SSS ||  || align=right | 2.5 km || 
|-id=351 bgcolor=#E9E9E9
| 531351 ||  || — || August 10, 2012 || Kitt Peak || Spacewatch ||  || align=right | 2.4 km || 
|-id=352 bgcolor=#fefefe
| 531352 ||  || — || January 10, 2011 || Kitt Peak || Spacewatch || H || align=right data-sort-value="0.69" | 690 m || 
|-id=353 bgcolor=#d6d6d6
| 531353 ||  || — || September 12, 2012 || Siding Spring || SSS ||  || align=right | 3.2 km || 
|-id=354 bgcolor=#fefefe
| 531354 ||  || — || September 14, 2012 || Mount Lemmon || Mount Lemmon Survey || H || align=right data-sort-value="0.60" | 600 m || 
|-id=355 bgcolor=#fefefe
| 531355 ||  || — || March 5, 2011 || Kitt Peak || Spacewatch || H || align=right data-sort-value="0.47" | 470 m || 
|-id=356 bgcolor=#d6d6d6
| 531356 ||  || — || September 14, 2012 || Catalina || CSS ||  || align=right | 3.1 km || 
|-id=357 bgcolor=#FA8072
| 531357 ||  || — || September 20, 2001 || Socorro || LINEAR ||  || align=right data-sort-value="0.57" | 570 m || 
|-id=358 bgcolor=#fefefe
| 531358 ||  || — || August 14, 2012 || Haleakala || Pan-STARRS ||  || align=right data-sort-value="0.74" | 740 m || 
|-id=359 bgcolor=#fefefe
| 531359 ||  || — || September 18, 2004 || Socorro || LINEAR || H || align=right data-sort-value="0.76" | 760 m || 
|-id=360 bgcolor=#fefefe
| 531360 ||  || — || September 15, 2012 || Kitt Peak || Spacewatch || H || align=right data-sort-value="0.59" | 590 m || 
|-id=361 bgcolor=#d6d6d6
| 531361 ||  || — || September 15, 2012 || Kitt Peak || Spacewatch ||  || align=right | 3.4 km || 
|-id=362 bgcolor=#d6d6d6
| 531362 ||  || — || April 2, 2005 || Mount Lemmon || Mount Lemmon Survey ||  || align=right | 2.8 km || 
|-id=363 bgcolor=#E9E9E9
| 531363 ||  || — || September 15, 2012 || Mount Lemmon || Mount Lemmon Survey ||  || align=right | 1.8 km || 
|-id=364 bgcolor=#d6d6d6
| 531364 ||  || — || September 15, 2012 || La Sagra || OAM Obs. ||  || align=right | 3.3 km || 
|-id=365 bgcolor=#E9E9E9
| 531365 ||  || — || September 15, 2012 || Mount Lemmon || Mount Lemmon Survey ||  || align=right data-sort-value="0.96" | 960 m || 
|-id=366 bgcolor=#d6d6d6
| 531366 ||  || — || November 20, 1995 || Kitt Peak || Spacewatch ||  || align=right | 2.9 km || 
|-id=367 bgcolor=#d6d6d6
| 531367 ||  || — || August 10, 2012 || Kitt Peak || Spacewatch ||  || align=right | 3.2 km || 
|-id=368 bgcolor=#C2FFFF
| 531368 ||  || — || September 13, 2012 || Mount Lemmon || Mount Lemmon Survey || L5 || align=right | 7.4 km || 
|-id=369 bgcolor=#d6d6d6
| 531369 ||  || — || January 31, 2009 || Mount Lemmon || Mount Lemmon Survey ||  || align=right | 2.8 km || 
|-id=370 bgcolor=#d6d6d6
| 531370 ||  || — || November 18, 2008 || Kitt Peak || Spacewatch ||  || align=right | 2.6 km || 
|-id=371 bgcolor=#fefefe
| 531371 ||  || — || September 12, 2012 || Siding Spring || SSS ||  || align=right data-sort-value="0.95" | 950 m || 
|-id=372 bgcolor=#C2FFFF
| 531372 ||  || — || November 11, 2001 || Kitt Peak || Spacewatch || L5 || align=right | 9.3 km || 
|-id=373 bgcolor=#fefefe
| 531373 ||  || — || September 14, 2012 || Catalina || CSS || H || align=right data-sort-value="0.65" | 650 m || 
|-id=374 bgcolor=#d6d6d6
| 531374 ||  || — || October 14, 2001 || Socorro || LINEAR ||  || align=right | 2.9 km || 
|-id=375 bgcolor=#d6d6d6
| 531375 ||  || — || September 16, 2001 || Socorro || LINEAR ||  || align=right | 2.6 km || 
|-id=376 bgcolor=#fefefe
| 531376 ||  || — || February 23, 2011 || Catalina || CSS || H || align=right data-sort-value="0.68" | 680 m || 
|-id=377 bgcolor=#d6d6d6
| 531377 ||  || — || September 16, 2012 || Kitt Peak || Spacewatch ||  || align=right | 3.0 km || 
|-id=378 bgcolor=#d6d6d6
| 531378 ||  || — || September 17, 2012 || Kitt Peak || Spacewatch ||  || align=right | 3.0 km || 
|-id=379 bgcolor=#d6d6d6
| 531379 ||  || — || September 17, 2012 || Mount Lemmon || Mount Lemmon Survey ||  || align=right | 2.3 km || 
|-id=380 bgcolor=#E9E9E9
| 531380 ||  || — || September 17, 2012 || Mount Lemmon || Mount Lemmon Survey ||  || align=right | 1.8 km || 
|-id=381 bgcolor=#d6d6d6
| 531381 ||  || — || September 17, 2012 || Mount Lemmon || Mount Lemmon Survey ||  || align=right | 2.9 km || 
|-id=382 bgcolor=#E9E9E9
| 531382 ||  || — || September 17, 2012 || Kitt Peak || Spacewatch ||  || align=right | 2.0 km || 
|-id=383 bgcolor=#d6d6d6
| 531383 ||  || — || September 17, 2012 || Mount Lemmon || Mount Lemmon Survey ||  || align=right | 2.6 km || 
|-id=384 bgcolor=#d6d6d6
| 531384 ||  || — || October 9, 2007 || Kitt Peak || Spacewatch ||  || align=right | 2.8 km || 
|-id=385 bgcolor=#E9E9E9
| 531385 ||  || — || September 14, 2012 || Kitt Peak || Spacewatch ||  || align=right | 1.6 km || 
|-id=386 bgcolor=#d6d6d6
| 531386 ||  || — || August 26, 2012 || Haleakala || Pan-STARRS ||  || align=right | 2.1 km || 
|-id=387 bgcolor=#d6d6d6
| 531387 ||  || — || April 4, 2010 || Kitt Peak || Spacewatch ||  || align=right | 2.7 km || 
|-id=388 bgcolor=#d6d6d6
| 531388 ||  || — || August 26, 2012 || Haleakala || Pan-STARRS ||  || align=right | 2.3 km || 
|-id=389 bgcolor=#E9E9E9
| 531389 ||  || — || September 17, 2012 || Kitt Peak || Spacewatch ||  || align=right | 1.7 km || 
|-id=390 bgcolor=#d6d6d6
| 531390 ||  || — || September 14, 2012 || Catalina || CSS ||  || align=right | 3.4 km || 
|-id=391 bgcolor=#fefefe
| 531391 ||  || — || April 30, 2006 || Kitt Peak || Spacewatch || H || align=right data-sort-value="0.51" | 510 m || 
|-id=392 bgcolor=#fefefe
| 531392 ||  || — || September 26, 2012 || Haleakala || Pan-STARRS || H || align=right data-sort-value="0.63" | 630 m || 
|-id=393 bgcolor=#d6d6d6
| 531393 ||  || — || March 14, 2010 || Mount Lemmon || Mount Lemmon Survey ||  || align=right | 2.9 km || 
|-id=394 bgcolor=#d6d6d6
| 531394 ||  || — || August 26, 2012 || Haleakala || Pan-STARRS ||  || align=right | 2.7 km || 
|-id=395 bgcolor=#E9E9E9
| 531395 ||  || — || October 17, 2003 || Kitt Peak || Spacewatch ||  || align=right | 2.0 km || 
|-id=396 bgcolor=#d6d6d6
| 531396 ||  || — || September 15, 2012 || Kitt Peak || Spacewatch || HYG || align=right | 2.3 km || 
|-id=397 bgcolor=#fefefe
| 531397 ||  || — || March 11, 2011 || Mount Lemmon || Mount Lemmon Survey || H || align=right data-sort-value="0.68" | 680 m || 
|-id=398 bgcolor=#E9E9E9
| 531398 ||  || — || October 3, 2008 || La Sagra || OAM Obs. || KON || align=right | 2.0 km || 
|-id=399 bgcolor=#d6d6d6
| 531399 ||  || — || November 18, 2007 || Kitt Peak || Spacewatch ||  || align=right | 1.9 km || 
|-id=400 bgcolor=#d6d6d6
| 531400 ||  || — || October 12, 2007 || Mount Lemmon || Mount Lemmon Survey ||  || align=right | 3.1 km || 
|}

531401–531500 

|-bgcolor=#E9E9E9
| 531401 ||  || — || September 16, 2012 || Kitt Peak || Spacewatch ||  || align=right | 1.9 km || 
|-id=402 bgcolor=#d6d6d6
| 531402 ||  || — || July 7, 2010 || WISE || WISE ||  || align=right | 2.3 km || 
|-id=403 bgcolor=#E9E9E9
| 531403 ||  || — || January 21, 2010 || WISE || WISE ||  || align=right | 2.1 km || 
|-id=404 bgcolor=#d6d6d6
| 531404 ||  || — || October 14, 2007 || Mount Lemmon || Mount Lemmon Survey ||  || align=right | 2.3 km || 
|-id=405 bgcolor=#E9E9E9
| 531405 ||  || — || September 22, 2012 || Kitt Peak || Spacewatch ||  || align=right | 2.1 km || 
|-id=406 bgcolor=#d6d6d6
| 531406 ||  || — || February 3, 2009 || Kitt Peak || Spacewatch ||  || align=right | 2.8 km || 
|-id=407 bgcolor=#d6d6d6
| 531407 ||  || — || October 16, 2007 || Mount Lemmon || Mount Lemmon Survey ||  || align=right | 2.3 km || 
|-id=408 bgcolor=#d6d6d6
| 531408 ||  || — || September 25, 2012 || Kitt Peak || Spacewatch ||  || align=right | 2.8 km || 
|-id=409 bgcolor=#d6d6d6
| 531409 ||  || — || September 25, 2012 || Kitt Peak || Spacewatch ||  || align=right | 2.7 km || 
|-id=410 bgcolor=#d6d6d6
| 531410 ||  || — || September 16, 2012 || Kitt Peak || Spacewatch ||  || align=right | 2.6 km || 
|-id=411 bgcolor=#d6d6d6
| 531411 ||  || — || September 18, 1995 || Kitt Peak || Spacewatch ||  || align=right | 3.0 km || 
|-id=412 bgcolor=#E9E9E9
| 531412 ||  || — || September 4, 2007 || Mount Lemmon || Mount Lemmon Survey ||  || align=right | 1.9 km || 
|-id=413 bgcolor=#E9E9E9
| 531413 ||  || — || September 4, 2007 || Mount Lemmon || Mount Lemmon Survey ||  || align=right | 2.2 km || 
|-id=414 bgcolor=#d6d6d6
| 531414 ||  || — || September 21, 2012 || Kitt Peak || Spacewatch ||  || align=right | 2.6 km || 
|-id=415 bgcolor=#E9E9E9
| 531415 ||  || — || November 30, 2008 || Kitt Peak || Spacewatch ||  || align=right | 1.3 km || 
|-id=416 bgcolor=#E9E9E9
| 531416 ||  || — || September 16, 2003 || Kitt Peak || Spacewatch ||  || align=right | 1.6 km || 
|-id=417 bgcolor=#E9E9E9
| 531417 ||  || — || September 4, 2003 || Kitt Peak || Spacewatch ||  || align=right | 1.2 km || 
|-id=418 bgcolor=#E9E9E9
| 531418 ||  || — || September 17, 2012 || Mount Lemmon || Mount Lemmon Survey ||  || align=right | 1.8 km || 
|-id=419 bgcolor=#E9E9E9
| 531419 ||  || — || November 17, 2008 || Kitt Peak || Spacewatch ||  || align=right | 1.3 km || 
|-id=420 bgcolor=#d6d6d6
| 531420 ||  || — || September 22, 2012 || Kitt Peak || Spacewatch ||  || align=right | 2.4 km || 
|-id=421 bgcolor=#d6d6d6
| 531421 ||  || — || September 24, 2012 || Kitt Peak || Spacewatch ||  || align=right | 2.8 km || 
|-id=422 bgcolor=#E9E9E9
| 531422 ||  || — || September 25, 2012 || Kitt Peak || Spacewatch ||  || align=right | 1.2 km || 
|-id=423 bgcolor=#d6d6d6
| 531423 ||  || — || February 3, 2009 || Mount Lemmon || Mount Lemmon Survey ||  || align=right | 2.6 km || 
|-id=424 bgcolor=#E9E9E9
| 531424 ||  || — || October 13, 2007 || Mount Lemmon || Mount Lemmon Survey ||  || align=right | 2.0 km || 
|-id=425 bgcolor=#d6d6d6
| 531425 ||  || — || September 18, 2012 || Mount Lemmon || Mount Lemmon Survey ||  || align=right | 2.1 km || 
|-id=426 bgcolor=#d6d6d6
| 531426 ||  || — || November 7, 2007 || Mount Lemmon || Mount Lemmon Survey ||  || align=right | 2.4 km || 
|-id=427 bgcolor=#d6d6d6
| 531427 ||  || — || January 20, 2009 || Kitt Peak || Spacewatch ||  || align=right | 2.3 km || 
|-id=428 bgcolor=#fefefe
| 531428 ||  || — || October 4, 2012 || Haleakala || Pan-STARRS || H || align=right data-sort-value="0.69" | 690 m || 
|-id=429 bgcolor=#fefefe
| 531429 ||  || — || July 28, 2009 || Catalina || CSS || H || align=right data-sort-value="0.83" | 830 m || 
|-id=430 bgcolor=#d6d6d6
| 531430 ||  || — || September 16, 2012 || Kitt Peak || Spacewatch ||  || align=right | 2.4 km || 
|-id=431 bgcolor=#E9E9E9
| 531431 ||  || — || September 20, 2012 || Socorro || LINEAR ||  || align=right | 1.8 km || 
|-id=432 bgcolor=#E9E9E9
| 531432 ||  || — || August 24, 2012 || Kitt Peak || Spacewatch ||  || align=right | 2.0 km || 
|-id=433 bgcolor=#d6d6d6
| 531433 ||  || — || September 16, 2012 || Mount Lemmon || Mount Lemmon Survey ||  || align=right | 3.3 km || 
|-id=434 bgcolor=#E9E9E9
| 531434 ||  || — || September 23, 2012 || Mount Lemmon || Mount Lemmon Survey ||  || align=right | 1.2 km || 
|-id=435 bgcolor=#E9E9E9
| 531435 ||  || — || September 16, 2012 || Catalina || CSS ||  || align=right | 2.8 km || 
|-id=436 bgcolor=#d6d6d6
| 531436 ||  || — || November 2, 2007 || Kitt Peak || Spacewatch ||  || align=right | 1.9 km || 
|-id=437 bgcolor=#d6d6d6
| 531437 ||  || — || October 6, 2012 || Haleakala || Pan-STARRS ||  || align=right | 3.0 km || 
|-id=438 bgcolor=#d6d6d6
| 531438 ||  || — || September 22, 2012 || Mount Lemmon || Mount Lemmon Survey ||  || align=right | 2.2 km || 
|-id=439 bgcolor=#E9E9E9
| 531439 ||  || — || September 11, 2007 || Mount Lemmon || Mount Lemmon Survey ||  || align=right | 2.3 km || 
|-id=440 bgcolor=#d6d6d6
| 531440 ||  || — || October 5, 2007 || Kitt Peak || Spacewatch ||  || align=right | 2.1 km || 
|-id=441 bgcolor=#E9E9E9
| 531441 ||  || — || September 15, 2012 || Kitt Peak || Spacewatch ||  || align=right | 1.4 km || 
|-id=442 bgcolor=#fefefe
| 531442 ||  || — || March 27, 2011 || Mount Lemmon || Mount Lemmon Survey || H || align=right data-sort-value="0.64" | 640 m || 
|-id=443 bgcolor=#d6d6d6
| 531443 ||  || — || January 1, 2008 || Kitt Peak || Spacewatch ||  || align=right | 2.0 km || 
|-id=444 bgcolor=#d6d6d6
| 531444 ||  || — || September 15, 2012 || Kitt Peak || Spacewatch ||  || align=right | 2.1 km || 
|-id=445 bgcolor=#d6d6d6
| 531445 ||  || — || September 11, 2012 || Siding Spring || SSS || TIR || align=right | 2.9 km || 
|-id=446 bgcolor=#fefefe
| 531446 ||  || — || September 25, 2001 || Kitt Peak || Spacewatch || H || align=right data-sort-value="0.77" | 770 m || 
|-id=447 bgcolor=#d6d6d6
| 531447 ||  || — || September 13, 2007 || Mount Lemmon || Mount Lemmon Survey ||  || align=right | 1.9 km || 
|-id=448 bgcolor=#d6d6d6
| 531448 ||  || — || September 15, 2012 || Kitt Peak || Spacewatch ||  || align=right | 2.9 km || 
|-id=449 bgcolor=#d6d6d6
| 531449 ||  || — || September 20, 2001 || Kitt Peak || Spacewatch ||  || align=right | 2.8 km || 
|-id=450 bgcolor=#fefefe
| 531450 ||  || — || September 26, 2012 || Haleakala || Pan-STARRS || H || align=right data-sort-value="0.64" | 640 m || 
|-id=451 bgcolor=#d6d6d6
| 531451 ||  || — || November 3, 2007 || Mount Lemmon || Mount Lemmon Survey ||  || align=right | 2.7 km || 
|-id=452 bgcolor=#E9E9E9
| 531452 ||  || — || October 7, 2012 || Haleakala || Pan-STARRS ||  || align=right | 1.5 km || 
|-id=453 bgcolor=#d6d6d6
| 531453 ||  || — || October 8, 2012 || Mount Lemmon || Mount Lemmon Survey ||  || align=right | 2.7 km || 
|-id=454 bgcolor=#d6d6d6
| 531454 ||  || — || February 4, 2009 || Mount Lemmon || Mount Lemmon Survey ||  || align=right | 2.1 km || 
|-id=455 bgcolor=#d6d6d6
| 531455 ||  || — || September 16, 2012 || Kitt Peak || Spacewatch ||  || align=right | 1.8 km || 
|-id=456 bgcolor=#d6d6d6
| 531456 ||  || — || October 30, 2007 || Kitt Peak || Spacewatch ||  || align=right | 2.5 km || 
|-id=457 bgcolor=#E9E9E9
| 531457 ||  || — || October 28, 2008 || Kitt Peak || Spacewatch ||  || align=right | 1.3 km || 
|-id=458 bgcolor=#d6d6d6
| 531458 ||  || — || October 11, 2007 || Mount Lemmon || Mount Lemmon Survey ||  || align=right | 2.0 km || 
|-id=459 bgcolor=#d6d6d6
| 531459 ||  || — || September 21, 2012 || Kitt Peak || Spacewatch ||  || align=right | 2.2 km || 
|-id=460 bgcolor=#d6d6d6
| 531460 ||  || — || September 21, 2012 || Kitt Peak || Spacewatch ||  || align=right | 2.0 km || 
|-id=461 bgcolor=#fefefe
| 531461 ||  || — || April 29, 2003 || Anderson Mesa || LONEOS || H || align=right data-sort-value="0.82" | 820 m || 
|-id=462 bgcolor=#fefefe
| 531462 ||  || — || October 9, 2012 || Catalina || CSS || H || align=right data-sort-value="0.95" | 950 m || 
|-id=463 bgcolor=#d6d6d6
| 531463 ||  || — || August 19, 2006 || Kitt Peak || Spacewatch || THM || align=right | 1.9 km || 
|-id=464 bgcolor=#d6d6d6
| 531464 ||  || — || October 30, 2002 || Kitt Peak || Spacewatch ||  || align=right | 1.8 km || 
|-id=465 bgcolor=#E9E9E9
| 531465 ||  || — || December 4, 2008 || Mount Lemmon || Mount Lemmon Survey ||  || align=right | 2.1 km || 
|-id=466 bgcolor=#d6d6d6
| 531466 ||  || — || October 21, 2007 || Mount Lemmon || Mount Lemmon Survey ||  || align=right | 2.4 km || 
|-id=467 bgcolor=#fefefe
| 531467 ||  || — || October 8, 2012 || Mount Lemmon || Mount Lemmon Survey || H || align=right data-sort-value="0.36" | 360 m || 
|-id=468 bgcolor=#d6d6d6
| 531468 ||  || — || November 4, 2007 || Kitt Peak || Spacewatch ||  || align=right | 2.1 km || 
|-id=469 bgcolor=#C2FFFF
| 531469 ||  || — || April 30, 2010 || WISE || WISE || L5 || align=right | 8.0 km || 
|-id=470 bgcolor=#fefefe
| 531470 ||  || — || October 6, 2012 || Haleakala || Pan-STARRS || H || align=right data-sort-value="0.53" | 530 m || 
|-id=471 bgcolor=#FA8072
| 531471 ||  || — || October 15, 1993 || Kitt Peak || Spacewatch ||  || align=right data-sort-value="0.58" | 580 m || 
|-id=472 bgcolor=#E9E9E9
| 531472 ||  || — || October 4, 2012 || Mount Lemmon || Mount Lemmon Survey ||  || align=right | 1.8 km || 
|-id=473 bgcolor=#d6d6d6
| 531473 ||  || — || November 19, 2007 || Kitt Peak || Spacewatch ||  || align=right | 2.5 km || 
|-id=474 bgcolor=#d6d6d6
| 531474 ||  || — || August 20, 2006 || Kitt Peak || Spacewatch ||  || align=right | 2.4 km || 
|-id=475 bgcolor=#E9E9E9
| 531475 ||  || — || September 16, 2012 || Kitt Peak || Spacewatch ||  || align=right | 1.4 km || 
|-id=476 bgcolor=#d6d6d6
| 531476 ||  || — || March 15, 2009 || Mount Lemmon || Mount Lemmon Survey ||  || align=right | 3.4 km || 
|-id=477 bgcolor=#d6d6d6
| 531477 ||  || — || December 4, 2007 || Catalina || CSS ||  || align=right | 1.9 km || 
|-id=478 bgcolor=#d6d6d6
| 531478 ||  || — || October 8, 2012 || Kitt Peak || Spacewatch ||  || align=right | 2.1 km || 
|-id=479 bgcolor=#fefefe
| 531479 ||  || — || October 8, 2012 || Catalina || CSS || H || align=right data-sort-value="0.60" | 600 m || 
|-id=480 bgcolor=#d6d6d6
| 531480 ||  || — || February 27, 2009 || Mount Lemmon || Mount Lemmon Survey || TIR || align=right | 2.5 km || 
|-id=481 bgcolor=#d6d6d6
| 531481 ||  || — || September 15, 2012 || Kitt Peak || Spacewatch ||  || align=right | 2.3 km || 
|-id=482 bgcolor=#d6d6d6
| 531482 ||  || — || September 16, 2012 || Kitt Peak || Spacewatch ||  || align=right | 2.3 km || 
|-id=483 bgcolor=#fefefe
| 531483 ||  || — || October 10, 2012 || Mount Lemmon || Mount Lemmon Survey ||  || align=right data-sort-value="0.62" | 620 m || 
|-id=484 bgcolor=#d6d6d6
| 531484 ||  || — || January 24, 2010 || WISE || WISE ||  || align=right | 2.4 km || 
|-id=485 bgcolor=#E9E9E9
| 531485 ||  || — || September 16, 2012 || Kitt Peak || Spacewatch || HOF || align=right | 2.1 km || 
|-id=486 bgcolor=#d6d6d6
| 531486 ||  || — || November 5, 2007 || Kitt Peak || Spacewatch || VER || align=right | 2.6 km || 
|-id=487 bgcolor=#d6d6d6
| 531487 ||  || — || September 21, 2012 || Kitt Peak || Spacewatch ||  || align=right | 2.9 km || 
|-id=488 bgcolor=#E9E9E9
| 531488 ||  || — || September 21, 2012 || Kitt Peak || Spacewatch ||  || align=right | 1.8 km || 
|-id=489 bgcolor=#fefefe
| 531489 ||  || — || March 27, 2011 || Kitt Peak || Spacewatch || H || align=right data-sort-value="0.52" | 520 m || 
|-id=490 bgcolor=#E9E9E9
| 531490 ||  || — || December 22, 2008 || Kitt Peak || Spacewatch ||  || align=right | 1.4 km || 
|-id=491 bgcolor=#fefefe
| 531491 ||  || — || March 23, 2006 || Kitt Peak || Spacewatch || H || align=right data-sort-value="0.59" | 590 m || 
|-id=492 bgcolor=#E9E9E9
| 531492 ||  || — || October 2, 2008 || Kitt Peak || Spacewatch ||  || align=right data-sort-value="0.74" | 740 m || 
|-id=493 bgcolor=#E9E9E9
| 531493 ||  || — || October 8, 2008 || Kitt Peak || Spacewatch ||  || align=right | 1.1 km || 
|-id=494 bgcolor=#fefefe
| 531494 ||  || — || October 9, 2012 || Haleakala || Pan-STARRS || H || align=right data-sort-value="0.44" | 440 m || 
|-id=495 bgcolor=#E9E9E9
| 531495 ||  || — || October 13, 2012 || Haleakala || Pan-STARRS ||  || align=right | 2.0 km || 
|-id=496 bgcolor=#d6d6d6
| 531496 ||  || — || October 20, 2007 || Mount Lemmon || Mount Lemmon Survey || THM || align=right | 1.7 km || 
|-id=497 bgcolor=#d6d6d6
| 531497 ||  || — || October 8, 2012 || Haleakala || Pan-STARRS ||  || align=right | 2.0 km || 
|-id=498 bgcolor=#fefefe
| 531498 ||  || — || October 10, 2012 || Haleakala || Pan-STARRS || H || align=right data-sort-value="0.73" | 730 m || 
|-id=499 bgcolor=#fefefe
| 531499 ||  || — || October 15, 2004 || Socorro || LINEAR || H || align=right data-sort-value="0.63" | 630 m || 
|-id=500 bgcolor=#E9E9E9
| 531500 ||  || — || November 18, 2003 || Kitt Peak || Spacewatch ||  || align=right | 2.4 km || 
|}

531501–531600 

|-bgcolor=#E9E9E9
| 531501 ||  || — || October 8, 2012 || Haleakala || Pan-STARRS || MAR || align=right data-sort-value="0.70" | 700 m || 
|-id=502 bgcolor=#fefefe
| 531502 ||  || — || October 8, 2012 || Mount Lemmon || Mount Lemmon Survey || H || align=right data-sort-value="0.78" | 780 m || 
|-id=503 bgcolor=#d6d6d6
| 531503 ||  || — || September 22, 2012 || Kitt Peak || Spacewatch ||  || align=right | 2.3 km || 
|-id=504 bgcolor=#d6d6d6
| 531504 ||  || — || September 22, 2012 || Kitt Peak || Spacewatch ||  || align=right | 3.5 km || 
|-id=505 bgcolor=#C2FFFF
| 531505 ||  || — || October 8, 2012 || Haleakala || Pan-STARRS || L5 || align=right | 7.8 km || 
|-id=506 bgcolor=#E9E9E9
| 531506 ||  || — || September 18, 2012 || Kitt Peak || Spacewatch || MAR || align=right | 1.0 km || 
|-id=507 bgcolor=#d6d6d6
| 531507 ||  || — || October 17, 2001 || Kitt Peak || Spacewatch || THM || align=right | 1.9 km || 
|-id=508 bgcolor=#E9E9E9
| 531508 ||  || — || October 23, 2008 || Kitt Peak || Spacewatch ||  || align=right | 1.1 km || 
|-id=509 bgcolor=#d6d6d6
| 531509 ||  || — || October 8, 2012 || Haleakala || Pan-STARRS || THM || align=right | 1.7 km || 
|-id=510 bgcolor=#E9E9E9
| 531510 ||  || — || October 8, 2012 || Haleakala || Pan-STARRS ||  || align=right | 1.7 km || 
|-id=511 bgcolor=#E9E9E9
| 531511 ||  || — || September 23, 2008 || Kitt Peak || Spacewatch ||  || align=right data-sort-value="0.87" | 870 m || 
|-id=512 bgcolor=#d6d6d6
| 531512 ||  || — || October 8, 2012 || Haleakala || Pan-STARRS ||  || align=right | 2.6 km || 
|-id=513 bgcolor=#d6d6d6
| 531513 ||  || — || October 8, 2012 || Haleakala || Pan-STARRS || HYG || align=right | 2.4 km || 
|-id=514 bgcolor=#d6d6d6
| 531514 ||  || — || October 6, 2012 || Mount Lemmon || Mount Lemmon Survey ||  || align=right | 2.6 km || 
|-id=515 bgcolor=#d6d6d6
| 531515 ||  || — || October 9, 2012 || Mount Lemmon || Mount Lemmon Survey ||  || align=right | 2.8 km || 
|-id=516 bgcolor=#d6d6d6
| 531516 ||  || — || October 9, 2012 || Mount Lemmon || Mount Lemmon Survey || EOS || align=right | 1.9 km || 
|-id=517 bgcolor=#d6d6d6
| 531517 ||  || — || February 22, 2009 || Kitt Peak || Spacewatch ||  || align=right | 2.9 km || 
|-id=518 bgcolor=#d6d6d6
| 531518 ||  || — || September 13, 2007 || Mount Lemmon || Mount Lemmon Survey || KOR || align=right | 1.0 km || 
|-id=519 bgcolor=#d6d6d6
| 531519 ||  || — || October 9, 2012 || Kitt Peak || Spacewatch ||  || align=right | 2.5 km || 
|-id=520 bgcolor=#E9E9E9
| 531520 ||  || — || September 16, 2012 || Mount Lemmon || Mount Lemmon Survey ||  || align=right | 1.4 km || 
|-id=521 bgcolor=#d6d6d6
| 531521 ||  || — || August 2, 2010 || WISE || WISE ||  || align=right | 3.4 km || 
|-id=522 bgcolor=#E9E9E9
| 531522 ||  || — || October 10, 2012 || Mount Lemmon || Mount Lemmon Survey ||  || align=right data-sort-value="0.78" | 780 m || 
|-id=523 bgcolor=#E9E9E9
| 531523 ||  || — || September 21, 2012 || Kitt Peak || Spacewatch ||  || align=right | 1.1 km || 
|-id=524 bgcolor=#d6d6d6
| 531524 ||  || — || October 10, 2012 || Kitt Peak || Spacewatch ||  || align=right | 2.4 km || 
|-id=525 bgcolor=#E9E9E9
| 531525 ||  || — || September 5, 2007 || Mount Lemmon || Mount Lemmon Survey || HOF || align=right | 2.4 km || 
|-id=526 bgcolor=#d6d6d6
| 531526 ||  || — || October 10, 2007 || Kitt Peak || Spacewatch ||  || align=right | 2.2 km || 
|-id=527 bgcolor=#E9E9E9
| 531527 ||  || — || September 17, 2012 || Kitt Peak || Spacewatch ||  || align=right | 1.7 km || 
|-id=528 bgcolor=#d6d6d6
| 531528 ||  || — || September 11, 2006 || Catalina || CSS ||  || align=right | 3.2 km || 
|-id=529 bgcolor=#d6d6d6
| 531529 ||  || — || August 19, 2006 || Kitt Peak || Spacewatch ||  || align=right | 2.5 km || 
|-id=530 bgcolor=#d6d6d6
| 531530 ||  || — || September 14, 2006 || Catalina || CSS ||  || align=right | 3.3 km || 
|-id=531 bgcolor=#d6d6d6
| 531531 ||  || — || April 8, 2010 || Kitt Peak || Spacewatch ||  || align=right | 2.8 km || 
|-id=532 bgcolor=#E9E9E9
| 531532 ||  || — || October 11, 2012 || Haleakala || Pan-STARRS ||  || align=right | 1.1 km || 
|-id=533 bgcolor=#d6d6d6
| 531533 ||  || — || May 25, 2006 || Mount Lemmon || Mount Lemmon Survey ||  || align=right | 3.1 km || 
|-id=534 bgcolor=#d6d6d6
| 531534 ||  || — || February 27, 2009 || Kitt Peak || Spacewatch ||  || align=right | 2.9 km || 
|-id=535 bgcolor=#d6d6d6
| 531535 ||  || — || October 13, 2012 || Haleakala || Pan-STARRS ||  || align=right | 2.5 km || 
|-id=536 bgcolor=#d6d6d6
| 531536 ||  || — || October 6, 2012 || Haleakala || Pan-STARRS ||  || align=right | 3.9 km || 
|-id=537 bgcolor=#d6d6d6
| 531537 ||  || — || October 13, 2012 || Haleakala || Pan-STARRS || EOS || align=right | 1.6 km || 
|-id=538 bgcolor=#C2FFFF
| 531538 ||  || — || September 22, 2012 || Kitt Peak || Spacewatch || L5 || align=right | 8.7 km || 
|-id=539 bgcolor=#E9E9E9
| 531539 ||  || — || October 4, 2012 || Mount Lemmon || Mount Lemmon Survey ||  || align=right | 1.4 km || 
|-id=540 bgcolor=#E9E9E9
| 531540 ||  || — || October 7, 2012 || Kitt Peak || Spacewatch ||  || align=right | 2.0 km || 
|-id=541 bgcolor=#d6d6d6
| 531541 ||  || — || October 9, 2007 || Mount Lemmon || Mount Lemmon Survey || TRE || align=right | 1.6 km || 
|-id=542 bgcolor=#d6d6d6
| 531542 ||  || — || March 2, 2009 || Kitt Peak || Spacewatch ||  || align=right | 3.0 km || 
|-id=543 bgcolor=#d6d6d6
| 531543 ||  || — || October 15, 2012 || Kitt Peak || Spacewatch ||  || align=right | 2.9 km || 
|-id=544 bgcolor=#E9E9E9
| 531544 ||  || — || October 28, 2008 || Kitt Peak || Spacewatch ||  || align=right | 1.3 km || 
|-id=545 bgcolor=#d6d6d6
| 531545 ||  || — || October 6, 2012 || Haleakala || Pan-STARRS ||  || align=right | 3.1 km || 
|-id=546 bgcolor=#d6d6d6
| 531546 ||  || — || August 18, 2006 || Kitt Peak || Spacewatch || HYG || align=right | 2.3 km || 
|-id=547 bgcolor=#E9E9E9
| 531547 ||  || — || October 7, 2012 || Haleakala || Pan-STARRS ||  || align=right | 1.6 km || 
|-id=548 bgcolor=#d6d6d6
| 531548 ||  || — || September 20, 2006 || Kitt Peak || Spacewatch ||  || align=right | 2.1 km || 
|-id=549 bgcolor=#d6d6d6
| 531549 ||  || — || October 8, 2012 || Mount Lemmon || Mount Lemmon Survey || EOS || align=right | 1.6 km || 
|-id=550 bgcolor=#E9E9E9
| 531550 ||  || — || May 5, 2011 || Kitt Peak || Spacewatch ||  || align=right data-sort-value="0.72" | 720 m || 
|-id=551 bgcolor=#E9E9E9
| 531551 ||  || — || September 18, 2012 || Kitt Peak || Spacewatch ||  || align=right | 2.1 km || 
|-id=552 bgcolor=#fefefe
| 531552 ||  || — || October 8, 2012 || Haleakala || Pan-STARRS || H || align=right data-sort-value="0.60" | 600 m || 
|-id=553 bgcolor=#d6d6d6
| 531553 ||  || — || October 8, 2012 || Mount Lemmon || Mount Lemmon Survey ||  || align=right | 2.6 km || 
|-id=554 bgcolor=#d6d6d6
| 531554 ||  || — || October 8, 2012 || Haleakala || Pan-STARRS ||  || align=right | 2.3 km || 
|-id=555 bgcolor=#C2FFFF
| 531555 ||  || — || October 8, 2012 || Mount Lemmon || Mount Lemmon Survey || L5 || align=right | 7.0 km || 
|-id=556 bgcolor=#d6d6d6
| 531556 ||  || — || October 10, 2007 || Mount Lemmon || Mount Lemmon Survey ||  || align=right | 2.0 km || 
|-id=557 bgcolor=#d6d6d6
| 531557 ||  || — || October 15, 2012 || Mount Lemmon || Mount Lemmon Survey ||  || align=right | 2.2 km || 
|-id=558 bgcolor=#d6d6d6
| 531558 ||  || — || August 18, 2006 || Kitt Peak || Spacewatch || THM || align=right | 1.7 km || 
|-id=559 bgcolor=#d6d6d6
| 531559 ||  || — || October 11, 2012 || Haleakala || Pan-STARRS ||  || align=right | 3.0 km || 
|-id=560 bgcolor=#d6d6d6
| 531560 ||  || — || September 21, 2012 || Kitt Peak || Spacewatch ||  || align=right | 2.8 km || 
|-id=561 bgcolor=#E9E9E9
| 531561 ||  || — || October 11, 2012 || Haleakala || Pan-STARRS ||  || align=right | 1.7 km || 
|-id=562 bgcolor=#E9E9E9
| 531562 ||  || — || September 14, 2012 || Mount Lemmon || Mount Lemmon Survey ||  || align=right | 1.9 km || 
|-id=563 bgcolor=#d6d6d6
| 531563 ||  || — || January 24, 2010 || WISE || WISE ||  || align=right | 2.9 km || 
|-id=564 bgcolor=#d6d6d6
| 531564 ||  || — || October 15, 2012 || Haleakala || Pan-STARRS ||  || align=right | 2.1 km || 
|-id=565 bgcolor=#d6d6d6
| 531565 ||  || — || October 10, 2012 || Mount Lemmon || Mount Lemmon Survey ||  || align=right | 2.4 km || 
|-id=566 bgcolor=#C2FFFF
| 531566 ||  || — || May 3, 2008 || Kitt Peak || Spacewatch || L5 || align=right | 7.8 km || 
|-id=567 bgcolor=#E9E9E9
| 531567 ||  || — || October 8, 2012 || Haleakala || Pan-STARRS ||  || align=right | 2.2 km || 
|-id=568 bgcolor=#d6d6d6
| 531568 ||  || — || November 8, 2007 || Kitt Peak || Spacewatch ||  || align=right | 1.7 km || 
|-id=569 bgcolor=#d6d6d6
| 531569 ||  || — || September 19, 2012 || Mount Lemmon || Mount Lemmon Survey ||  || align=right | 2.0 km || 
|-id=570 bgcolor=#d6d6d6
| 531570 ||  || — || October 17, 2006 || Kitt Peak || Spacewatch ||  || align=right | 3.5 km || 
|-id=571 bgcolor=#d6d6d6
| 531571 ||  || — || October 15, 1995 || Kitt Peak || Spacewatch || VER || align=right | 2.0 km || 
|-id=572 bgcolor=#d6d6d6
| 531572 ||  || — || September 14, 2012 || Kitt Peak || Spacewatch ||  || align=right | 2.4 km || 
|-id=573 bgcolor=#d6d6d6
| 531573 ||  || — || September 24, 2012 || Kitt Peak || Spacewatch ||  || align=right | 2.5 km || 
|-id=574 bgcolor=#d6d6d6
| 531574 ||  || — || December 30, 2007 || Mount Lemmon || Mount Lemmon Survey ||  || align=right | 1.5 km || 
|-id=575 bgcolor=#d6d6d6
| 531575 ||  || — || November 11, 2001 || Socorro || LINEAR ||  || align=right | 3.5 km || 
|-id=576 bgcolor=#d6d6d6
| 531576 ||  || — || October 11, 2012 || Kitt Peak || Spacewatch ||  || align=right | 2.9 km || 
|-id=577 bgcolor=#E9E9E9
| 531577 ||  || — || October 6, 2012 || Haleakala || Pan-STARRS ||  || align=right | 2.9 km || 
|-id=578 bgcolor=#d6d6d6
| 531578 ||  || — || October 14, 2012 || Catalina || CSS ||  || align=right | 2.6 km || 
|-id=579 bgcolor=#d6d6d6
| 531579 ||  || — || October 10, 2012 || Haleakala || Pan-STARRS || Tj (2.98) || align=right | 3.5 km || 
|-id=580 bgcolor=#d6d6d6
| 531580 ||  || — || November 19, 2001 || Socorro || LINEAR ||  || align=right | 3.0 km || 
|-id=581 bgcolor=#d6d6d6
| 531581 ||  || — || November 11, 2007 || Mount Lemmon || Mount Lemmon Survey || THB || align=right | 3.2 km || 
|-id=582 bgcolor=#C2FFFF
| 531582 ||  || — || May 15, 2009 || Kitt Peak || Spacewatch || L5 || align=right | 8.3 km || 
|-id=583 bgcolor=#d6d6d6
| 531583 ||  || — || October 11, 2012 || Kitt Peak || Spacewatch ||  || align=right | 2.7 km || 
|-id=584 bgcolor=#d6d6d6
| 531584 ||  || — || February 2, 2008 || Mount Lemmon || Mount Lemmon Survey ||  || align=right | 1.9 km || 
|-id=585 bgcolor=#d6d6d6
| 531585 ||  || — || October 16, 2007 || Mount Lemmon || Mount Lemmon Survey ||  || align=right | 1.8 km || 
|-id=586 bgcolor=#d6d6d6
| 531586 ||  || — || October 9, 2007 || Mount Lemmon || Mount Lemmon Survey ||  || align=right | 2.3 km || 
|-id=587 bgcolor=#E9E9E9
| 531587 ||  || — || April 11, 2010 || Mount Lemmon || Mount Lemmon Survey ||  || align=right | 3.2 km || 
|-id=588 bgcolor=#d6d6d6
| 531588 ||  || — || September 10, 2007 || Mount Lemmon || Mount Lemmon Survey ||  || align=right | 2.0 km || 
|-id=589 bgcolor=#d6d6d6
| 531589 ||  || — || October 7, 2007 || Mount Lemmon || Mount Lemmon Survey ||  || align=right | 2.0 km || 
|-id=590 bgcolor=#d6d6d6
| 531590 ||  || — || October 8, 2012 || Mount Lemmon || Mount Lemmon Survey ||  || align=right | 1.6 km || 
|-id=591 bgcolor=#d6d6d6
| 531591 ||  || — || November 11, 2007 || Mount Lemmon || Mount Lemmon Survey ||  || align=right | 2.4 km || 
|-id=592 bgcolor=#d6d6d6
| 531592 ||  || — || October 10, 2012 || Haleakala || Pan-STARRS ||  || align=right | 2.5 km || 
|-id=593 bgcolor=#d6d6d6
| 531593 ||  || — || November 2, 2007 || Mount Lemmon || Mount Lemmon Survey ||  || align=right | 3.9 km || 
|-id=594 bgcolor=#E9E9E9
| 531594 ||  || — || October 27, 1998 || Kitt Peak || Spacewatch ||  || align=right | 1.9 km || 
|-id=595 bgcolor=#E9E9E9
| 531595 ||  || — || October 11, 2012 || Haleakala || Pan-STARRS ||  || align=right data-sort-value="0.75" | 750 m || 
|-id=596 bgcolor=#d6d6d6
| 531596 ||  || — || October 4, 2012 || Mount Lemmon || Mount Lemmon Survey ||  || align=right | 3.1 km || 
|-id=597 bgcolor=#E9E9E9
| 531597 ||  || — || October 6, 2012 || Haleakala || Pan-STARRS ||  || align=right | 2.3 km || 
|-id=598 bgcolor=#d6d6d6
| 531598 ||  || — || December 5, 2007 || Mount Lemmon || Mount Lemmon Survey ||  || align=right | 3.0 km || 
|-id=599 bgcolor=#E9E9E9
| 531599 ||  || — || September 19, 2012 || Mount Lemmon || Mount Lemmon Survey ||  || align=right | 1.2 km || 
|-id=600 bgcolor=#E9E9E9
| 531600 ||  || — || October 15, 2012 || Kitt Peak || Spacewatch ||  || align=right | 1.5 km || 
|}

531601–531700 

|-bgcolor=#E9E9E9
| 531601 ||  || — || October 6, 2012 || Mount Lemmon || Mount Lemmon Survey ||  || align=right | 1.4 km || 
|-id=602 bgcolor=#d6d6d6
| 531602 ||  || — || October 8, 2012 || Kitt Peak || Spacewatch ||  || align=right | 2.9 km || 
|-id=603 bgcolor=#E9E9E9
| 531603 ||  || — || November 17, 2008 || Kitt Peak || Spacewatch ||  || align=right | 1.2 km || 
|-id=604 bgcolor=#d6d6d6
| 531604 ||  || — || October 8, 2012 || Haleakala || Pan-STARRS ||  || align=right | 3.0 km || 
|-id=605 bgcolor=#E9E9E9
| 531605 ||  || — || August 10, 2007 || Kitt Peak || Spacewatch ||  || align=right | 1.3 km || 
|-id=606 bgcolor=#d6d6d6
| 531606 ||  || — || October 8, 2012 || Haleakala || Pan-STARRS ||  || align=right | 2.5 km || 
|-id=607 bgcolor=#E9E9E9
| 531607 ||  || — || October 9, 2012 || Mount Lemmon || Mount Lemmon Survey ||  || align=right | 1.7 km || 
|-id=608 bgcolor=#d6d6d6
| 531608 ||  || — || October 9, 2012 || Haleakala || Pan-STARRS ||  || align=right | 1.7 km || 
|-id=609 bgcolor=#d6d6d6
| 531609 ||  || — || October 10, 2012 || Mount Lemmon || Mount Lemmon Survey ||  || align=right | 2.2 km || 
|-id=610 bgcolor=#E9E9E9
| 531610 ||  || — || October 14, 2012 || Kitt Peak || Spacewatch ||  || align=right | 1.8 km || 
|-id=611 bgcolor=#d6d6d6
| 531611 ||  || — || April 9, 2010 || Kitt Peak || Spacewatch ||  || align=right | 3.1 km || 
|-id=612 bgcolor=#d6d6d6
| 531612 ||  || — || October 15, 2012 || Kitt Peak || Spacewatch ||  || align=right | 2.0 km || 
|-id=613 bgcolor=#E9E9E9
| 531613 ||  || — || October 5, 2012 || Haleakala || Pan-STARRS ||  || align=right | 2.1 km || 
|-id=614 bgcolor=#E9E9E9
| 531614 ||  || — || October 11, 2012 || Kitt Peak || Spacewatch ||  || align=right | 2.0 km || 
|-id=615 bgcolor=#d6d6d6
| 531615 ||  || — || September 14, 2006 || Catalina || CSS ||  || align=right | 2.0 km || 
|-id=616 bgcolor=#E9E9E9
| 531616 ||  || — || March 13, 1996 || Kitt Peak || Spacewatch ||  || align=right | 2.4 km || 
|-id=617 bgcolor=#E9E9E9
| 531617 ||  || — || October 9, 2012 || Mount Lemmon || Mount Lemmon Survey ||  || align=right | 1.7 km || 
|-id=618 bgcolor=#E9E9E9
| 531618 ||  || — || October 9, 2012 || Mount Lemmon || Mount Lemmon Survey ||  || align=right | 1.7 km || 
|-id=619 bgcolor=#fefefe
| 531619 ||  || — || October 9, 2012 || Mount Lemmon || Mount Lemmon Survey || H || align=right data-sort-value="0.55" | 550 m || 
|-id=620 bgcolor=#d6d6d6
| 531620 ||  || — || October 11, 2012 || Mount Lemmon || Mount Lemmon Survey ||  || align=right | 2.3 km || 
|-id=621 bgcolor=#d6d6d6
| 531621 ||  || — || October 11, 2007 || Kitt Peak || Spacewatch ||  || align=right | 2.5 km || 
|-id=622 bgcolor=#E9E9E9
| 531622 ||  || — || October 14, 2012 || Mount Lemmon || Mount Lemmon Survey ||  || align=right data-sort-value="0.77" | 770 m || 
|-id=623 bgcolor=#d6d6d6
| 531623 ||  || — || October 8, 2012 || Catalina || CSS ||  || align=right | 2.7 km || 
|-id=624 bgcolor=#fefefe
| 531624 ||  || — || October 10, 2012 || Haleakala || Pan-STARRS || H || align=right data-sort-value="0.78" | 780 m || 
|-id=625 bgcolor=#E9E9E9
| 531625 ||  || — || October 7, 2012 || Haleakala || Pan-STARRS ||  || align=right | 1.9 km || 
|-id=626 bgcolor=#d6d6d6
| 531626 ||  || — || February 11, 2010 || WISE || WISE ||  || align=right | 3.2 km || 
|-id=627 bgcolor=#E9E9E9
| 531627 ||  || — || October 7, 2012 || Haleakala || Pan-STARRS ||  || align=right | 1.3 km || 
|-id=628 bgcolor=#E9E9E9
| 531628 ||  || — || October 8, 2012 || Mount Lemmon || Mount Lemmon Survey ||  || align=right | 2.2 km || 
|-id=629 bgcolor=#d6d6d6
| 531629 ||  || — || September 18, 2012 || Kitt Peak || Spacewatch ||  || align=right | 2.7 km || 
|-id=630 bgcolor=#E9E9E9
| 531630 ||  || — || October 8, 2012 || Haleakala || Pan-STARRS || GEF || align=right data-sort-value="0.85" | 850 m || 
|-id=631 bgcolor=#E9E9E9
| 531631 ||  || — || October 16, 2012 || Mount Lemmon || Mount Lemmon Survey ||  || align=right | 1.8 km || 
|-id=632 bgcolor=#E9E9E9
| 531632 ||  || — || October 16, 2012 || Mount Lemmon || Mount Lemmon Survey ||  || align=right | 2.0 km || 
|-id=633 bgcolor=#fefefe
| 531633 ||  || — || October 17, 1999 || Kitt Peak || Spacewatch || H || align=right data-sort-value="0.52" | 520 m || 
|-id=634 bgcolor=#d6d6d6
| 531634 ||  || — || October 8, 2012 || Mount Lemmon || Mount Lemmon Survey ||  || align=right | 2.8 km || 
|-id=635 bgcolor=#d6d6d6
| 531635 ||  || — || December 19, 2007 || Mount Lemmon || Mount Lemmon Survey || THB || align=right | 2.6 km || 
|-id=636 bgcolor=#d6d6d6
| 531636 ||  || — || October 17, 2012 || Mount Lemmon || Mount Lemmon Survey ||  || align=right | 2.3 km || 
|-id=637 bgcolor=#d6d6d6
| 531637 ||  || — || October 8, 2012 || Kitt Peak || Spacewatch ||  || align=right | 2.8 km || 
|-id=638 bgcolor=#d6d6d6
| 531638 ||  || — || December 15, 2007 || Mount Lemmon || Mount Lemmon Survey || URS || align=right | 2.6 km || 
|-id=639 bgcolor=#d6d6d6
| 531639 ||  || — || October 16, 2012 || Kitt Peak || Spacewatch ||  || align=right | 2.0 km || 
|-id=640 bgcolor=#d6d6d6
| 531640 ||  || — || October 8, 2012 || Kitt Peak || Spacewatch ||  || align=right | 2.7 km || 
|-id=641 bgcolor=#d6d6d6
| 531641 ||  || — || October 17, 2012 || Kitt Peak || Spacewatch ||  || align=right | 2.7 km || 
|-id=642 bgcolor=#d6d6d6
| 531642 ||  || — || October 23, 2001 || Kitt Peak || Spacewatch ||  || align=right | 2.4 km || 
|-id=643 bgcolor=#d6d6d6
| 531643 ||  || — || October 18, 2012 || Haleakala || Pan-STARRS || HYG || align=right | 2.0 km || 
|-id=644 bgcolor=#d6d6d6
| 531644 ||  || — || October 18, 2012 || Haleakala || Pan-STARRS ||  || align=right | 2.1 km || 
|-id=645 bgcolor=#fefefe
| 531645 ||  || — || April 19, 2006 || Mount Lemmon || Mount Lemmon Survey || H || align=right data-sort-value="0.62" | 620 m || 
|-id=646 bgcolor=#d6d6d6
| 531646 ||  || — || October 19, 2012 || Mount Lemmon || Mount Lemmon Survey ||  || align=right | 3.2 km || 
|-id=647 bgcolor=#d6d6d6
| 531647 ||  || — || September 26, 2012 || Mount Lemmon || Mount Lemmon Survey ||  || align=right | 2.8 km || 
|-id=648 bgcolor=#d6d6d6
| 531648 ||  || — || October 19, 2012 || Haleakala || Pan-STARRS ||  || align=right | 2.7 km || 
|-id=649 bgcolor=#d6d6d6
| 531649 ||  || — || October 20, 2012 || Mount Lemmon || Mount Lemmon Survey ||  || align=right | 2.5 km || 
|-id=650 bgcolor=#d6d6d6
| 531650 ||  || — || November 7, 2007 || Kitt Peak || Spacewatch ||  || align=right | 1.9 km || 
|-id=651 bgcolor=#E9E9E9
| 531651 ||  || — || October 18, 2012 || Haleakala || Pan-STARRS ||  || align=right | 1.9 km || 
|-id=652 bgcolor=#d6d6d6
| 531652 ||  || — || October 19, 2012 || Haleakala || Pan-STARRS || THM || align=right | 1.7 km || 
|-id=653 bgcolor=#d6d6d6
| 531653 ||  || — || October 2, 2006 || Mount Lemmon || Mount Lemmon Survey ||  || align=right | 3.4 km || 
|-id=654 bgcolor=#E9E9E9
| 531654 ||  || — || October 14, 2012 || Kitt Peak || Spacewatch ||  || align=right | 1.9 km || 
|-id=655 bgcolor=#d6d6d6
| 531655 ||  || — || December 18, 2001 || Kitt Peak || Spacewatch ||  || align=right | 2.4 km || 
|-id=656 bgcolor=#E9E9E9
| 531656 ||  || — || October 21, 2012 || Haleakala || Pan-STARRS ||  || align=right data-sort-value="0.83" | 830 m || 
|-id=657 bgcolor=#E9E9E9
| 531657 ||  || — || November 27, 2008 || La Sagra || OAM Obs. || MAR || align=right | 1.3 km || 
|-id=658 bgcolor=#E9E9E9
| 531658 ||  || — || May 3, 2010 || WISE || WISE ||  || align=right data-sort-value="0.88" | 880 m || 
|-id=659 bgcolor=#d6d6d6
| 531659 ||  || — || October 11, 2012 || Kitt Peak || Spacewatch ||  || align=right | 2.6 km || 
|-id=660 bgcolor=#d6d6d6
| 531660 ||  || — || October 15, 2012 || Kitt Peak || Spacewatch ||  || align=right | 3.5 km || 
|-id=661 bgcolor=#d6d6d6
| 531661 ||  || — || August 28, 2012 || Mount Lemmon || Mount Lemmon Survey ||  || align=right | 2.2 km || 
|-id=662 bgcolor=#d6d6d6
| 531662 ||  || — || September 19, 2012 || Mount Lemmon || Mount Lemmon Survey || EOS || align=right | 1.6 km || 
|-id=663 bgcolor=#d6d6d6
| 531663 ||  || — || September 19, 2012 || Mount Lemmon || Mount Lemmon Survey ||  || align=right | 2.7 km || 
|-id=664 bgcolor=#d6d6d6
| 531664 ||  || — || September 10, 2007 || Kitt Peak || Spacewatch || BRA || align=right | 1.2 km || 
|-id=665 bgcolor=#E9E9E9
| 531665 ||  || — || September 16, 2012 || Kitt Peak || Spacewatch ||  || align=right | 1.2 km || 
|-id=666 bgcolor=#d6d6d6
| 531666 ||  || — || October 15, 2012 || Kitt Peak || Spacewatch ||  || align=right | 2.6 km || 
|-id=667 bgcolor=#d6d6d6
| 531667 ||  || — || September 28, 2006 || Catalina || CSS || Tj (2.99) || align=right | 3.1 km || 
|-id=668 bgcolor=#fefefe
| 531668 ||  || — || October 8, 2012 || Kitt Peak || Spacewatch || H || align=right data-sort-value="0.79" | 790 m || 
|-id=669 bgcolor=#E9E9E9
| 531669 ||  || — || October 17, 2012 || Catalina || CSS ||  || align=right | 2.2 km || 
|-id=670 bgcolor=#fefefe
| 531670 ||  || — || March 26, 2011 || Haleakala || Pan-STARRS || H || align=right data-sort-value="0.85" | 850 m || 
|-id=671 bgcolor=#fefefe
| 531671 ||  || — || October 19, 2012 || Catalina || CSS || H || align=right data-sort-value="0.44" | 440 m || 
|-id=672 bgcolor=#d6d6d6
| 531672 ||  || — || September 19, 2001 || Socorro || LINEAR ||  || align=right | 2.0 km || 
|-id=673 bgcolor=#d6d6d6
| 531673 ||  || — || January 1, 2008 || Catalina || CSS ||  || align=right | 2.0 km || 
|-id=674 bgcolor=#E9E9E9
| 531674 ||  || — || September 21, 2012 || Kitt Peak || Spacewatch ||  || align=right data-sort-value="0.94" | 940 m || 
|-id=675 bgcolor=#fefefe
| 531675 ||  || — || May 21, 2006 || Kitt Peak || Spacewatch || H || align=right data-sort-value="0.56" | 560 m || 
|-id=676 bgcolor=#d6d6d6
| 531676 ||  || — || October 22, 2012 || Kitt Peak || Spacewatch ||  || align=right | 1.8 km || 
|-id=677 bgcolor=#E9E9E9
| 531677 ||  || — || October 15, 2012 || Catalina || CSS ||  || align=right | 1.7 km || 
|-id=678 bgcolor=#fefefe
| 531678 ||  || — || April 14, 2011 || Haleakala || Pan-STARRS || H || align=right data-sort-value="0.51" | 510 m || 
|-id=679 bgcolor=#d6d6d6
| 531679 ||  || — || October 30, 2007 || Kitt Peak || Spacewatch ||  || align=right | 3.1 km || 
|-id=680 bgcolor=#d6d6d6
| 531680 ||  || — || December 17, 2007 || Kitt Peak || Spacewatch ||  || align=right | 1.8 km || 
|-id=681 bgcolor=#FA8072
| 531681 ||  || — || October 27, 2012 || Mount Lemmon || Mount Lemmon Survey || H || align=right data-sort-value="0.83" | 830 m || 
|-id=682 bgcolor=#C2E0FF
| 531682 ||  || — || October 21, 2012 || Haleakala || Pan-STARRS || cubewano (hot)critical || align=right | 280 km || 
|-id=683 bgcolor=#C2E0FF
| 531683 ||  || — || October 9, 2010 || Haleakala || Pan-STARRS || res3:5 || align=right | 193 km || 
|-id=684 bgcolor=#C2E0FF
| 531684 ||  || — || November 9, 2010 || Haleakala || Pan-STARRS || cubewano (cold) || align=right | 255 km || 
|-id=685 bgcolor=#d6d6d6
| 531685 ||  || — || October 21, 2012 || Haleakala || Pan-STARRS ||  || align=right | 1.9 km || 
|-id=686 bgcolor=#d6d6d6
| 531686 ||  || — || October 18, 2012 || Haleakala || Pan-STARRS ||  || align=right | 2.2 km || 
|-id=687 bgcolor=#d6d6d6
| 531687 ||  || — || October 7, 2007 || Mount Lemmon || Mount Lemmon Survey ||  || align=right | 1.6 km || 
|-id=688 bgcolor=#d6d6d6
| 531688 ||  || — || November 5, 2007 || Mount Lemmon || Mount Lemmon Survey ||  || align=right | 2.3 km || 
|-id=689 bgcolor=#d6d6d6
| 531689 ||  || — || September 14, 2006 || Kitt Peak || Spacewatch ||  || align=right | 3.1 km || 
|-id=690 bgcolor=#d6d6d6
| 531690 ||  || — || October 20, 2012 || Haleakala || Pan-STARRS ||  || align=right | 3.3 km || 
|-id=691 bgcolor=#d6d6d6
| 531691 ||  || — || October 27, 2012 || Mount Lemmon || Mount Lemmon Survey ||  || align=right | 3.0 km || 
|-id=692 bgcolor=#d6d6d6
| 531692 ||  || — || December 7, 2001 || Kitt Peak || Spacewatch ||  || align=right | 3.4 km || 
|-id=693 bgcolor=#d6d6d6
| 531693 ||  || — || November 16, 2001 || Kitt Peak || Spacewatch ||  || align=right | 3.2 km || 
|-id=694 bgcolor=#E9E9E9
| 531694 ||  || — || September 29, 2003 || Kitt Peak || Spacewatch ||  || align=right | 1.4 km || 
|-id=695 bgcolor=#E9E9E9
| 531695 ||  || — || October 21, 2012 || Haleakala || Pan-STARRS ||  || align=right | 1.2 km || 
|-id=696 bgcolor=#E9E9E9
| 531696 ||  || — || October 21, 2012 || Haleakala || Pan-STARRS ||  || align=right | 1.7 km || 
|-id=697 bgcolor=#E9E9E9
| 531697 ||  || — || September 4, 2007 || Mount Lemmon || Mount Lemmon Survey ||  || align=right | 1.8 km || 
|-id=698 bgcolor=#d6d6d6
| 531698 ||  || — || October 16, 2012 || Mount Lemmon || Mount Lemmon Survey ||  || align=right | 2.5 km || 
|-id=699 bgcolor=#d6d6d6
| 531699 ||  || — || October 18, 2012 || Haleakala || Pan-STARRS ||  || align=right | 1.9 km || 
|-id=700 bgcolor=#E9E9E9
| 531700 ||  || — || October 18, 2012 || Haleakala || Pan-STARRS ||  || align=right | 1.6 km || 
|}

531701–531800 

|-bgcolor=#E9E9E9
| 531701 ||  || — || October 18, 2012 || Haleakala || Pan-STARRS ||  || align=right | 1.8 km || 
|-id=702 bgcolor=#E9E9E9
| 531702 ||  || — || April 15, 2010 || Mount Lemmon || Mount Lemmon Survey ||  || align=right | 1.4 km || 
|-id=703 bgcolor=#E9E9E9
| 531703 ||  || — || March 11, 2005 || Mount Lemmon || Mount Lemmon Survey ||  || align=right | 1.7 km || 
|-id=704 bgcolor=#E9E9E9
| 531704 ||  || — || December 17, 2009 || Mount Lemmon || Mount Lemmon Survey ||  || align=right | 1.8 km || 
|-id=705 bgcolor=#E9E9E9
| 531705 ||  || — || January 3, 2009 || Mount Lemmon || Mount Lemmon Survey ||  || align=right | 2.1 km || 
|-id=706 bgcolor=#E9E9E9
| 531706 ||  || — || May 24, 2010 || WISE || WISE ||  || align=right | 1.5 km || 
|-id=707 bgcolor=#d6d6d6
| 531707 ||  || — || July 2, 2005 || Kitt Peak || Spacewatch ||  || align=right | 3.1 km || 
|-id=708 bgcolor=#d6d6d6
| 531708 ||  || — || October 20, 2012 || Mount Lemmon || Mount Lemmon Survey ||  || align=right | 3.6 km || 
|-id=709 bgcolor=#d6d6d6
| 531709 ||  || — || October 21, 2012 || Mount Lemmon || Mount Lemmon Survey ||  || align=right | 2.4 km || 
|-id=710 bgcolor=#d6d6d6
| 531710 ||  || — || September 15, 2007 || Kitt Peak || Spacewatch ||  || align=right | 1.8 km || 
|-id=711 bgcolor=#d6d6d6
| 531711 ||  || — || October 17, 2012 || Haleakala || Pan-STARRS ||  || align=right | 1.8 km || 
|-id=712 bgcolor=#d6d6d6
| 531712 ||  || — || October 8, 2012 || Kitt Peak || Spacewatch ||  || align=right | 2.2 km || 
|-id=713 bgcolor=#d6d6d6
| 531713 ||  || — || October 18, 2012 || Haleakala || Pan-STARRS ||  || align=right | 1.8 km || 
|-id=714 bgcolor=#d6d6d6
| 531714 ||  || — || October 19, 2012 || Mount Lemmon || Mount Lemmon Survey ||  || align=right | 2.8 km || 
|-id=715 bgcolor=#d6d6d6
| 531715 ||  || — || October 19, 2012 || Mount Lemmon || Mount Lemmon Survey ||  || align=right | 2.8 km || 
|-id=716 bgcolor=#d6d6d6
| 531716 ||  || — || October 20, 2012 || Haleakala || Pan-STARRS ||  || align=right | 1.8 km || 
|-id=717 bgcolor=#d6d6d6
| 531717 ||  || — || October 21, 2012 || Haleakala || Pan-STARRS ||  || align=right | 2.2 km || 
|-id=718 bgcolor=#fefefe
| 531718 ||  || — || November 1, 2012 || Haleakala || Pan-STARRS || H || align=right data-sort-value="0.65" | 650 m || 
|-id=719 bgcolor=#d6d6d6
| 531719 ||  || — || October 18, 2012 || Haleakala || Pan-STARRS ||  || align=right | 2.1 km || 
|-id=720 bgcolor=#E9E9E9
| 531720 ||  || — || March 11, 2005 || Mount Lemmon || Mount Lemmon Survey ||  || align=right | 2.0 km || 
|-id=721 bgcolor=#C2FFFF
| 531721 ||  || — || September 20, 2011 || Mount Lemmon || Mount Lemmon Survey || L5 || align=right | 7.6 km || 
|-id=722 bgcolor=#d6d6d6
| 531722 ||  || — || October 18, 2012 || Haleakala || Pan-STARRS || THM || align=right | 1.9 km || 
|-id=723 bgcolor=#d6d6d6
| 531723 ||  || — || September 15, 2012 || Kitt Peak || Spacewatch ||  || align=right | 2.7 km || 
|-id=724 bgcolor=#d6d6d6
| 531724 ||  || — || October 18, 2012 || Haleakala || Pan-STARRS ||  || align=right | 2.8 km || 
|-id=725 bgcolor=#d6d6d6
| 531725 ||  || — || October 8, 2012 || Mount Lemmon || Mount Lemmon Survey ||  || align=right | 1.6 km || 
|-id=726 bgcolor=#d6d6d6
| 531726 ||  || — || November 4, 2012 || Haleakala || Pan-STARRS ||  || align=right | 2.5 km || 
|-id=727 bgcolor=#d6d6d6
| 531727 ||  || — || October 22, 2012 || Haleakala || Pan-STARRS ||  || align=right | 3.1 km || 
|-id=728 bgcolor=#d6d6d6
| 531728 ||  || — || October 21, 2012 || Haleakala || Pan-STARRS ||  || align=right | 2.0 km || 
|-id=729 bgcolor=#d6d6d6
| 531729 ||  || — || October 18, 2012 || Haleakala || Pan-STARRS ||  || align=right | 2.4 km || 
|-id=730 bgcolor=#d6d6d6
| 531730 ||  || — || October 8, 2012 || Mount Lemmon || Mount Lemmon Survey ||  || align=right | 2.6 km || 
|-id=731 bgcolor=#d6d6d6
| 531731 ||  || — || October 22, 2012 || Mount Lemmon || Mount Lemmon Survey ||  || align=right | 2.5 km || 
|-id=732 bgcolor=#E9E9E9
| 531732 ||  || — || September 16, 2012 || Kitt Peak || Spacewatch ||  || align=right | 1.3 km || 
|-id=733 bgcolor=#E9E9E9
| 531733 ||  || — || October 6, 2012 || Mount Lemmon || Mount Lemmon Survey ||  || align=right | 1.6 km || 
|-id=734 bgcolor=#d6d6d6
| 531734 ||  || — || October 21, 2012 || Haleakala || Pan-STARRS ||  || align=right | 2.4 km || 
|-id=735 bgcolor=#d6d6d6
| 531735 ||  || — || September 27, 2006 || Kitt Peak || Spacewatch ||  || align=right | 1.9 km || 
|-id=736 bgcolor=#d6d6d6
| 531736 ||  || — || August 16, 2006 || Siding Spring || SSS || Tj (2.96) || align=right | 3.2 km || 
|-id=737 bgcolor=#E9E9E9
| 531737 ||  || — || November 6, 2012 || Kitt Peak || Spacewatch ||  || align=right | 2.4 km || 
|-id=738 bgcolor=#fefefe
| 531738 ||  || — || May 5, 2011 || Mount Lemmon || Mount Lemmon Survey || H || align=right data-sort-value="0.53" | 530 m || 
|-id=739 bgcolor=#d6d6d6
| 531739 ||  || — || November 6, 2012 || Mount Lemmon || Mount Lemmon Survey ||  || align=right | 3.2 km || 
|-id=740 bgcolor=#d6d6d6
| 531740 ||  || — || September 19, 2012 || Mount Lemmon || Mount Lemmon Survey ||  || align=right | 2.4 km || 
|-id=741 bgcolor=#d6d6d6
| 531741 ||  || — || November 17, 2007 || Kitt Peak || Spacewatch ||  || align=right | 2.2 km || 
|-id=742 bgcolor=#d6d6d6
| 531742 ||  || — || October 18, 2012 || Haleakala || Pan-STARRS ||  || align=right | 2.3 km || 
|-id=743 bgcolor=#d6d6d6
| 531743 ||  || — || October 22, 2012 || Haleakala || Pan-STARRS ||  || align=right | 3.3 km || 
|-id=744 bgcolor=#d6d6d6
| 531744 ||  || — || December 17, 2007 || Kitt Peak || Spacewatch ||  || align=right | 1.8 km || 
|-id=745 bgcolor=#E9E9E9
| 531745 ||  || — || June 4, 2011 || Mount Lemmon || Mount Lemmon Survey ||  || align=right | 1.2 km || 
|-id=746 bgcolor=#E9E9E9
| 531746 ||  || — || October 21, 2012 || Haleakala || Pan-STARRS ||  || align=right | 2.1 km || 
|-id=747 bgcolor=#E9E9E9
| 531747 ||  || — || October 21, 2012 || Haleakala || Pan-STARRS ||  || align=right | 1.4 km || 
|-id=748 bgcolor=#d6d6d6
| 531748 ||  || — || December 10, 2001 || Kitt Peak || Spacewatch ||  || align=right | 2.9 km || 
|-id=749 bgcolor=#E9E9E9
| 531749 ||  || — || October 21, 2012 || Haleakala || Pan-STARRS ||  || align=right | 2.5 km || 
|-id=750 bgcolor=#E9E9E9
| 531750 ||  || — || October 21, 2012 || Haleakala || Pan-STARRS ||  || align=right | 2.2 km || 
|-id=751 bgcolor=#d6d6d6
| 531751 ||  || — || November 13, 2012 || Mount Lemmon || Mount Lemmon Survey ||  || align=right | 2.4 km || 
|-id=752 bgcolor=#E9E9E9
| 531752 ||  || — || October 21, 2012 || Haleakala || Pan-STARRS ||  || align=right | 2.2 km || 
|-id=753 bgcolor=#d6d6d6
| 531753 ||  || — || October 23, 2012 || Mount Lemmon || Mount Lemmon Survey ||  || align=right | 1.7 km || 
|-id=754 bgcolor=#d6d6d6
| 531754 ||  || — || October 8, 2007 || Mount Lemmon || Mount Lemmon Survey ||  || align=right | 1.8 km || 
|-id=755 bgcolor=#E9E9E9
| 531755 ||  || — || October 9, 2012 || Mount Lemmon || Mount Lemmon Survey ||  || align=right | 2.3 km || 
|-id=756 bgcolor=#fefefe
| 531756 ||  || — || April 27, 2011 || Mount Lemmon || Mount Lemmon Survey || H || align=right data-sort-value="0.72" | 720 m || 
|-id=757 bgcolor=#d6d6d6
| 531757 ||  || — || September 2, 2012 || Haleakala || Pan-STARRS ||  || align=right | 2.5 km || 
|-id=758 bgcolor=#fefefe
| 531758 ||  || — || October 17, 2012 || Mount Lemmon || Mount Lemmon Survey || H || align=right data-sort-value="0.73" | 730 m || 
|-id=759 bgcolor=#d6d6d6
| 531759 ||  || — || October 21, 2012 || Mount Lemmon || Mount Lemmon Survey ||  || align=right | 2.5 km || 
|-id=760 bgcolor=#d6d6d6
| 531760 ||  || — || October 23, 2012 || Mount Lemmon || Mount Lemmon Survey ||  || align=right | 2.0 km || 
|-id=761 bgcolor=#d6d6d6
| 531761 ||  || — || October 21, 2012 || Haleakala || Pan-STARRS || VER || align=right | 2.4 km || 
|-id=762 bgcolor=#d6d6d6
| 531762 ||  || — || November 4, 2012 || Kitt Peak || Spacewatch ||  || align=right | 1.8 km || 
|-id=763 bgcolor=#d6d6d6
| 531763 ||  || — || March 1, 2008 || Mount Lemmon || Mount Lemmon Survey ||  || align=right | 2.5 km || 
|-id=764 bgcolor=#d6d6d6
| 531764 ||  || — || October 4, 2006 || Mount Lemmon || Mount Lemmon Survey ||  || align=right | 3.6 km || 
|-id=765 bgcolor=#E9E9E9
| 531765 ||  || — || November 7, 2012 || Haleakala || Pan-STARRS ||  || align=right | 1.6 km || 
|-id=766 bgcolor=#d6d6d6
| 531766 ||  || — || November 14, 2012 || Kitt Peak || Spacewatch ||  || align=right | 2.1 km || 
|-id=767 bgcolor=#d6d6d6
| 531767 ||  || — || November 6, 2012 || Kitt Peak || Spacewatch ||  || align=right | 2.8 km || 
|-id=768 bgcolor=#d6d6d6
| 531768 ||  || — || November 7, 2012 || Mount Lemmon || Mount Lemmon Survey ||  || align=right | 2.4 km || 
|-id=769 bgcolor=#E9E9E9
| 531769 ||  || — || December 31, 2008 || Kitt Peak || Spacewatch ||  || align=right | 2.0 km || 
|-id=770 bgcolor=#d6d6d6
| 531770 ||  || — || November 12, 2012 || Mount Lemmon || Mount Lemmon Survey ||  || align=right | 2.9 km || 
|-id=771 bgcolor=#E9E9E9
| 531771 ||  || — || November 14, 2012 || Kitt Peak || Spacewatch ||  || align=right | 1.7 km || 
|-id=772 bgcolor=#d6d6d6
| 531772 ||  || — || October 31, 2006 || Kitt Peak || Spacewatch ||  || align=right | 3.0 km || 
|-id=773 bgcolor=#d6d6d6
| 531773 ||  || — || October 22, 2006 || Mount Lemmon || Mount Lemmon Survey ||  || align=right | 2.6 km || 
|-id=774 bgcolor=#d6d6d6
| 531774 ||  || — || November 7, 2012 || Haleakala || Pan-STARRS ||  || align=right | 1.8 km || 
|-id=775 bgcolor=#d6d6d6
| 531775 ||  || — || December 19, 2007 || Mount Lemmon || Mount Lemmon Survey ||  || align=right | 2.9 km || 
|-id=776 bgcolor=#E9E9E9
| 531776 ||  || — || November 13, 2012 || Mount Lemmon || Mount Lemmon Survey ||  || align=right | 1.7 km || 
|-id=777 bgcolor=#d6d6d6
| 531777 ||  || — || November 15, 2012 || Catalina || CSS ||  || align=right | 2.5 km || 
|-id=778 bgcolor=#d6d6d6
| 531778 ||  || — || September 16, 2012 || Mount Lemmon || Mount Lemmon Survey ||  || align=right | 2.9 km || 
|-id=779 bgcolor=#E9E9E9
| 531779 ||  || — || October 12, 2007 || Mount Lemmon || Mount Lemmon Survey ||  || align=right | 2.0 km || 
|-id=780 bgcolor=#d6d6d6
| 531780 ||  || — || September 27, 2006 || Catalina || CSS || EUP || align=right | 5.0 km || 
|-id=781 bgcolor=#d6d6d6
| 531781 ||  || — || October 9, 2012 || Mount Lemmon || Mount Lemmon Survey ||  || align=right | 2.5 km || 
|-id=782 bgcolor=#fefefe
| 531782 ||  || — || April 21, 2006 || Catalina || CSS || H || align=right data-sort-value="0.65" | 650 m || 
|-id=783 bgcolor=#fefefe
| 531783 ||  || — || December 8, 1998 || Kitt Peak || Spacewatch || H || align=right data-sort-value="0.72" | 720 m || 
|-id=784 bgcolor=#d6d6d6
| 531784 ||  || — || October 21, 2012 || Haleakala || Pan-STARRS ||  || align=right | 3.1 km || 
|-id=785 bgcolor=#d6d6d6
| 531785 ||  || — || October 19, 2012 || Mount Lemmon || Mount Lemmon Survey ||  || align=right | 2.4 km || 
|-id=786 bgcolor=#d6d6d6
| 531786 ||  || — || October 25, 2012 || Kitt Peak || Spacewatch ||  || align=right | 2.4 km || 
|-id=787 bgcolor=#d6d6d6
| 531787 ||  || — || October 13, 2012 || Kitt Peak || Spacewatch ||  || align=right | 3.2 km || 
|-id=788 bgcolor=#d6d6d6
| 531788 ||  || — || October 21, 2012 || Haleakala || Pan-STARRS || Tj (2.98) || align=right | 2.6 km || 
|-id=789 bgcolor=#d6d6d6
| 531789 ||  || — || October 23, 2012 || Mount Lemmon || Mount Lemmon Survey ||  || align=right | 2.6 km || 
|-id=790 bgcolor=#d6d6d6
| 531790 ||  || — || November 26, 2012 || Mount Lemmon || Mount Lemmon Survey ||  || align=right | 3.0 km || 
|-id=791 bgcolor=#d6d6d6
| 531791 ||  || — || September 25, 2012 || Mount Lemmon || Mount Lemmon Survey ||  || align=right | 2.4 km || 
|-id=792 bgcolor=#d6d6d6
| 531792 ||  || — || October 7, 2007 || Kitt Peak || Spacewatch ||  || align=right | 2.3 km || 
|-id=793 bgcolor=#d6d6d6
| 531793 ||  || — || November 23, 2012 || Kitt Peak || Spacewatch ||  || align=right | 2.1 km || 
|-id=794 bgcolor=#d6d6d6
| 531794 ||  || — || August 24, 2011 || Haleakala || Pan-STARRS ||  || align=right | 2.9 km || 
|-id=795 bgcolor=#d6d6d6
| 531795 ||  || — || November 8, 2007 || Kitt Peak || Spacewatch ||  || align=right | 2.1 km || 
|-id=796 bgcolor=#d6d6d6
| 531796 ||  || — || November 7, 2012 || Kitt Peak || Spacewatch ||  || align=right | 2.9 km || 
|-id=797 bgcolor=#d6d6d6
| 531797 ||  || — || December 15, 2007 || Mount Lemmon || Mount Lemmon Survey ||  || align=right | 2.1 km || 
|-id=798 bgcolor=#d6d6d6
| 531798 ||  || — || October 18, 2006 || Kitt Peak || Spacewatch ||  || align=right | 2.9 km || 
|-id=799 bgcolor=#d6d6d6
| 531799 ||  || — || November 12, 2012 || Mount Lemmon || Mount Lemmon Survey ||  || align=right | 1.7 km || 
|-id=800 bgcolor=#d6d6d6
| 531800 ||  || — || October 22, 2012 || Haleakala || Pan-STARRS ||  || align=right | 2.2 km || 
|}

531801–531900 

|-bgcolor=#d6d6d6
| 531801 ||  || — || November 9, 2007 || Kitt Peak || Spacewatch ||  || align=right | 1.9 km || 
|-id=802 bgcolor=#d6d6d6
| 531802 ||  || — || November 6, 2012 || Mount Lemmon || Mount Lemmon Survey ||  || align=right | 2.4 km || 
|-id=803 bgcolor=#E9E9E9
| 531803 ||  || — || November 23, 2012 || Kitt Peak || Spacewatch ||  || align=right | 1.6 km || 
|-id=804 bgcolor=#d6d6d6
| 531804 ||  || — || November 23, 2006 || Kitt Peak || Spacewatch || 7:4 || align=right | 2.5 km || 
|-id=805 bgcolor=#E9E9E9
| 531805 ||  || — || December 3, 2012 || Mount Lemmon || Mount Lemmon Survey ||  || align=right | 1.9 km || 
|-id=806 bgcolor=#d6d6d6
| 531806 ||  || — || October 20, 2012 || Mount Lemmon || Mount Lemmon Survey || URS || align=right | 2.8 km || 
|-id=807 bgcolor=#E9E9E9
| 531807 ||  || — || December 5, 2012 || Mount Lemmon || Mount Lemmon Survey ||  || align=right | 1.9 km || 
|-id=808 bgcolor=#E9E9E9
| 531808 ||  || — || June 29, 2010 || WISE || WISE || HOF || align=right | 2.4 km || 
|-id=809 bgcolor=#d6d6d6
| 531809 ||  || — || December 6, 2012 || Kitt Peak || Spacewatch ||  || align=right | 2.6 km || 
|-id=810 bgcolor=#fefefe
| 531810 ||  || — || July 2, 2011 || Mount Lemmon || Mount Lemmon Survey ||  || align=right data-sort-value="0.68" | 680 m || 
|-id=811 bgcolor=#E9E9E9
| 531811 ||  || — || July 28, 2011 || Haleakala || Pan-STARRS ||  || align=right | 2.1 km || 
|-id=812 bgcolor=#E9E9E9
| 531812 ||  || — || December 4, 2012 || Mount Lemmon || Mount Lemmon Survey ||  || align=right | 1.9 km || 
|-id=813 bgcolor=#d6d6d6
| 531813 ||  || — || October 26, 2001 || Kitt Peak || Spacewatch ||  || align=right | 2.2 km || 
|-id=814 bgcolor=#d6d6d6
| 531814 ||  || — || December 4, 2012 || Mount Lemmon || Mount Lemmon Survey ||  || align=right | 3.1 km || 
|-id=815 bgcolor=#E9E9E9
| 531815 ||  || — || July 28, 2011 || Haleakala || Pan-STARRS ||  || align=right | 2.0 km || 
|-id=816 bgcolor=#d6d6d6
| 531816 ||  || — || November 5, 2012 || Kitt Peak || Spacewatch || 7:4 || align=right | 3.4 km || 
|-id=817 bgcolor=#d6d6d6
| 531817 ||  || — || December 4, 2012 || Mount Lemmon || Mount Lemmon Survey ||  || align=right | 2.7 km || 
|-id=818 bgcolor=#E9E9E9
| 531818 ||  || — || September 24, 2007 || Kitt Peak || Spacewatch ||  || align=right | 1.5 km || 
|-id=819 bgcolor=#d6d6d6
| 531819 ||  || — || October 17, 2012 || Mount Lemmon || Mount Lemmon Survey ||  || align=right | 1.8 km || 
|-id=820 bgcolor=#d6d6d6
| 531820 ||  || — || December 9, 2012 || Haleakala || Pan-STARRS ||  || align=right | 2.5 km || 
|-id=821 bgcolor=#E9E9E9
| 531821 ||  || — || December 22, 2008 || Kitt Peak || Spacewatch ||  || align=right | 2.4 km || 
|-id=822 bgcolor=#d6d6d6
| 531822 ||  || — || September 18, 2006 || Socorro || LINEAR || Tj (2.95) || align=right | 3.1 km || 
|-id=823 bgcolor=#d6d6d6
| 531823 ||  || — || December 17, 2007 || Kitt Peak || Spacewatch ||  || align=right | 3.6 km || 
|-id=824 bgcolor=#fefefe
| 531824 ||  || — || December 7, 2012 || Haleakala || Pan-STARRS ||  || align=right data-sort-value="0.59" | 590 m || 
|-id=825 bgcolor=#d6d6d6
| 531825 ||  || — || October 23, 2012 || Mount Lemmon || Mount Lemmon Survey ||  || align=right | 2.3 km || 
|-id=826 bgcolor=#d6d6d6
| 531826 ||  || — || November 7, 2012 || Mount Lemmon || Mount Lemmon Survey ||  || align=right | 3.1 km || 
|-id=827 bgcolor=#d6d6d6
| 531827 ||  || — || December 30, 2007 || Mount Lemmon || Mount Lemmon Survey || THM || align=right | 1.7 km || 
|-id=828 bgcolor=#d6d6d6
| 531828 ||  || — || December 9, 2001 || Socorro || LINEAR ||  || align=right | 3.0 km || 
|-id=829 bgcolor=#fefefe
| 531829 ||  || — || April 28, 2008 || Mount Lemmon || Mount Lemmon Survey || H || align=right data-sort-value="0.54" | 540 m || 
|-id=830 bgcolor=#d6d6d6
| 531830 ||  || — || May 11, 2003 || Kitt Peak || Spacewatch ||  || align=right | 3.3 km || 
|-id=831 bgcolor=#d6d6d6
| 531831 ||  || — || December 3, 2012 || Mount Lemmon || Mount Lemmon Survey ||  || align=right | 3.6 km || 
|-id=832 bgcolor=#d6d6d6
| 531832 ||  || — || February 1, 2010 || WISE || WISE ||  || align=right | 6.1 km || 
|-id=833 bgcolor=#d6d6d6
| 531833 ||  || — || December 3, 2012 || Mount Lemmon || Mount Lemmon Survey ||  || align=right | 2.3 km || 
|-id=834 bgcolor=#E9E9E9
| 531834 ||  || — || January 23, 2010 || WISE || WISE ||  || align=right | 2.8 km || 
|-id=835 bgcolor=#d6d6d6
| 531835 ||  || — || December 9, 2012 || Haleakala || Pan-STARRS ||  || align=right | 2.5 km || 
|-id=836 bgcolor=#d6d6d6
| 531836 ||  || — || March 25, 2008 || Kitt Peak || Spacewatch ||  || align=right | 2.5 km || 
|-id=837 bgcolor=#fefefe
| 531837 ||  || — || September 28, 2009 || Mount Lemmon || Mount Lemmon Survey || H || align=right data-sort-value="0.73" | 730 m || 
|-id=838 bgcolor=#d6d6d6
| 531838 ||  || — || October 31, 2006 || Mount Lemmon || Mount Lemmon Survey ||  || align=right | 2.4 km || 
|-id=839 bgcolor=#d6d6d6
| 531839 ||  || — || June 16, 2010 || WISE || WISE ||  || align=right | 3.3 km || 
|-id=840 bgcolor=#d6d6d6
| 531840 ||  || — || December 23, 2012 || Haleakala || Pan-STARRS ||  || align=right | 1.8 km || 
|-id=841 bgcolor=#d6d6d6
| 531841 ||  || — || February 8, 2008 || Kitt Peak || Spacewatch ||  || align=right | 2.0 km || 
|-id=842 bgcolor=#d6d6d6
| 531842 ||  || — || September 20, 2011 || Kitt Peak || Spacewatch ||  || align=right | 2.4 km || 
|-id=843 bgcolor=#d6d6d6
| 531843 ||  || — || December 22, 2012 || Haleakala || Pan-STARRS ||  || align=right | 2.9 km || 
|-id=844 bgcolor=#d6d6d6
| 531844 ||  || — || December 23, 2012 || Haleakala || Pan-STARRS ||  || align=right | 2.4 km || 
|-id=845 bgcolor=#fefefe
| 531845 ||  || — || April 23, 2007 || Mount Lemmon || Mount Lemmon Survey ||  || align=right data-sort-value="0.61" | 610 m || 
|-id=846 bgcolor=#fefefe
| 531846 ||  || — || February 17, 2010 || Kitt Peak || Spacewatch ||  || align=right data-sort-value="0.66" | 660 m || 
|-id=847 bgcolor=#d6d6d6
| 531847 ||  || — || January 3, 2013 || Mount Lemmon || Mount Lemmon Survey ||  || align=right | 2.5 km || 
|-id=848 bgcolor=#d6d6d6
| 531848 ||  || — || October 23, 2011 || Haleakala || Pan-STARRS ||  || align=right | 2.9 km || 
|-id=849 bgcolor=#d6d6d6
| 531849 ||  || — || November 23, 2006 || Mount Lemmon || Mount Lemmon Survey ||  || align=right | 2.3 km || 
|-id=850 bgcolor=#d6d6d6
| 531850 ||  || — || July 28, 2011 || Haleakala || Pan-STARRS ||  || align=right | 3.1 km || 
|-id=851 bgcolor=#d6d6d6
| 531851 ||  || — || December 13, 2012 || Mount Lemmon || Mount Lemmon Survey || EUP || align=right | 3.0 km || 
|-id=852 bgcolor=#d6d6d6
| 531852 ||  || — || December 9, 2012 || Mount Lemmon || Mount Lemmon Survey ||  || align=right | 2.1 km || 
|-id=853 bgcolor=#d6d6d6
| 531853 ||  || — || September 25, 2011 || Haleakala || Pan-STARRS || LIX || align=right | 3.6 km || 
|-id=854 bgcolor=#d6d6d6
| 531854 ||  || — || January 5, 2013 || Mount Lemmon || Mount Lemmon Survey ||  || align=right | 2.0 km || 
|-id=855 bgcolor=#d6d6d6
| 531855 ||  || — || July 7, 2010 || WISE || WISE ||  || align=right | 3.8 km || 
|-id=856 bgcolor=#d6d6d6
| 531856 ||  || — || December 23, 2012 || Haleakala || Pan-STARRS ||  || align=right | 2.6 km || 
|-id=857 bgcolor=#d6d6d6
| 531857 ||  || — || January 6, 2013 || Kitt Peak || Spacewatch ||  || align=right | 2.8 km || 
|-id=858 bgcolor=#d6d6d6
| 531858 ||  || — || April 7, 2008 || Catalina || CSS ||  || align=right | 2.8 km || 
|-id=859 bgcolor=#d6d6d6
| 531859 ||  || — || September 20, 2011 || Haleakala || Pan-STARRS ||  || align=right | 2.5 km || 
|-id=860 bgcolor=#d6d6d6
| 531860 ||  || — || January 10, 2013 || Haleakala || Pan-STARRS ||  || align=right | 2.6 km || 
|-id=861 bgcolor=#d6d6d6
| 531861 ||  || — || February 8, 2002 || Socorro || LINEAR ||  || align=right | 3.0 km || 
|-id=862 bgcolor=#d6d6d6
| 531862 ||  || — || December 23, 2012 || Haleakala || Pan-STARRS ||  || align=right | 2.8 km || 
|-id=863 bgcolor=#d6d6d6
| 531863 ||  || — || December 23, 2012 || Haleakala || Pan-STARRS ||  || align=right | 3.3 km || 
|-id=864 bgcolor=#fefefe
| 531864 ||  || — || June 3, 2010 || WISE || WISE ||  || align=right | 2.3 km || 
|-id=865 bgcolor=#d6d6d6
| 531865 ||  || — || January 8, 2002 || Socorro || LINEAR ||  || align=right | 3.1 km || 
|-id=866 bgcolor=#d6d6d6
| 531866 ||  || — || February 12, 2008 || Mount Lemmon || Mount Lemmon Survey ||  || align=right | 3.3 km || 
|-id=867 bgcolor=#d6d6d6
| 531867 ||  || — || December 23, 2012 || Haleakala || Pan-STARRS ||  || align=right | 3.2 km || 
|-id=868 bgcolor=#d6d6d6
| 531868 ||  || — || January 5, 2013 || Mount Lemmon || Mount Lemmon Survey || Tj (2.98) || align=right | 2.7 km || 
|-id=869 bgcolor=#fefefe
| 531869 ||  || — || November 12, 2012 || Mount Lemmon || Mount Lemmon Survey ||  || align=right data-sort-value="0.79" | 790 m || 
|-id=870 bgcolor=#d6d6d6
| 531870 ||  || — || December 9, 2012 || Mount Lemmon || Mount Lemmon Survey ||  || align=right | 2.6 km || 
|-id=871 bgcolor=#fefefe
| 531871 ||  || — || July 28, 2011 || Haleakala || Pan-STARRS ||  || align=right data-sort-value="0.64" | 640 m || 
|-id=872 bgcolor=#fefefe
| 531872 ||  || — || December 6, 2012 || Mount Lemmon || Mount Lemmon Survey ||  || align=right data-sort-value="0.78" | 780 m || 
|-id=873 bgcolor=#d6d6d6
| 531873 ||  || — || January 3, 2013 || Haleakala || Pan-STARRS ||  || align=right | 3.6 km || 
|-id=874 bgcolor=#d6d6d6
| 531874 ||  || — || November 3, 2011 || Mount Lemmon || Mount Lemmon Survey ||  || align=right | 3.1 km || 
|-id=875 bgcolor=#d6d6d6
| 531875 ||  || — || January 3, 2013 || Haleakala || Pan-STARRS ||  || align=right | 3.8 km || 
|-id=876 bgcolor=#d6d6d6
| 531876 ||  || — || March 8, 2008 || Kitt Peak || Spacewatch ||  || align=right | 1.8 km || 
|-id=877 bgcolor=#d6d6d6
| 531877 ||  || — || March 1, 2008 || Kitt Peak || Spacewatch ||  || align=right | 2.6 km || 
|-id=878 bgcolor=#d6d6d6
| 531878 ||  || — || September 24, 2011 || Mount Lemmon || Mount Lemmon Survey ||  || align=right | 1.7 km || 
|-id=879 bgcolor=#d6d6d6
| 531879 ||  || — || October 25, 2011 || Haleakala || Pan-STARRS || EOS || align=right | 1.5 km || 
|-id=880 bgcolor=#d6d6d6
| 531880 ||  || — || November 12, 2006 || Mount Lemmon || Mount Lemmon Survey ||  || align=right | 1.7 km || 
|-id=881 bgcolor=#d6d6d6
| 531881 ||  || — || October 7, 2005 || Mount Lemmon || Mount Lemmon Survey ||  || align=right | 2.5 km || 
|-id=882 bgcolor=#d6d6d6
| 531882 ||  || — || September 26, 2005 || Kitt Peak || Spacewatch ||  || align=right | 2.6 km || 
|-id=883 bgcolor=#d6d6d6
| 531883 ||  || — || November 15, 2006 || Kitt Peak || Spacewatch ||  || align=right | 2.4 km || 
|-id=884 bgcolor=#d6d6d6
| 531884 ||  || — || November 21, 2006 || Mount Lemmon || Mount Lemmon Survey || EOS || align=right | 1.9 km || 
|-id=885 bgcolor=#d6d6d6
| 531885 ||  || — || October 24, 2011 || Haleakala || Pan-STARRS ||  || align=right | 2.7 km || 
|-id=886 bgcolor=#d6d6d6
| 531886 ||  || — || October 26, 2011 || Haleakala || Pan-STARRS ||  || align=right | 3.3 km || 
|-id=887 bgcolor=#d6d6d6
| 531887 ||  || — || January 10, 2013 || Haleakala || Pan-STARRS ||  || align=right | 2.9 km || 
|-id=888 bgcolor=#d6d6d6
| 531888 ||  || — || September 25, 2011 || Haleakala || Pan-STARRS ||  || align=right | 2.4 km || 
|-id=889 bgcolor=#d6d6d6
| 531889 ||  || — || January 10, 2013 || Haleakala || Pan-STARRS ||  || align=right | 2.7 km || 
|-id=890 bgcolor=#d6d6d6
| 531890 ||  || — || January 10, 2013 || Haleakala || Pan-STARRS ||  || align=right | 2.7 km || 
|-id=891 bgcolor=#d6d6d6
| 531891 ||  || — || January 10, 2013 || Haleakala || Pan-STARRS ||  || align=right | 2.2 km || 
|-id=892 bgcolor=#d6d6d6
| 531892 ||  || — || January 10, 2013 || Haleakala || Pan-STARRS ||  || align=right | 2.4 km || 
|-id=893 bgcolor=#fefefe
| 531893 ||  || — || January 5, 2013 || Mount Lemmon || Mount Lemmon Survey ||  || align=right data-sort-value="0.72" | 720 m || 
|-id=894 bgcolor=#d6d6d6
| 531894 ||  || — || January 9, 1997 || Kitt Peak || Spacewatch ||  || align=right | 2.6 km || 
|-id=895 bgcolor=#FA8072
| 531895 ||  || — || January 8, 2013 || Kitt Peak || Spacewatch ||  || align=right data-sort-value="0.98" | 980 m || 
|-id=896 bgcolor=#d6d6d6
| 531896 ||  || — || September 24, 2011 || Haleakala || Pan-STARRS || EOS || align=right | 1.8 km || 
|-id=897 bgcolor=#d6d6d6
| 531897 ||  || — || March 8, 2008 || Mount Lemmon || Mount Lemmon Survey ||  || align=right | 1.8 km || 
|-id=898 bgcolor=#FFC2E0
| 531898 ||  || — || January 16, 2013 || Haleakala || Pan-STARRS || AMOcritical || align=right data-sort-value="0.22" | 220 m || 
|-id=899 bgcolor=#FFC2E0
| 531899 ||  || — || January 18, 2013 || Catalina || CSS || ATEPHA || align=right data-sort-value="0.39" | 390 m || 
|-id=900 bgcolor=#d6d6d6
| 531900 ||  || — || February 9, 2008 || Kitt Peak || Spacewatch ||  || align=right | 2.7 km || 
|}

531901–532000 

|-bgcolor=#d6d6d6
| 531901 ||  || — || March 26, 2008 || Mount Lemmon || Mount Lemmon Survey ||  || align=right | 2.3 km || 
|-id=902 bgcolor=#d6d6d6
| 531902 ||  || — || December 23, 2012 || Haleakala || Pan-STARRS ||  || align=right | 2.2 km || 
|-id=903 bgcolor=#d6d6d6
| 531903 ||  || — || January 3, 2013 || Haleakala || Pan-STARRS || Tj (2.99) || align=right | 3.1 km || 
|-id=904 bgcolor=#d6d6d6
| 531904 ||  || — || January 7, 2013 || Kitt Peak || Spacewatch ||  || align=right | 4.2 km || 
|-id=905 bgcolor=#d6d6d6
| 531905 ||  || — || January 16, 2013 || Haleakala || Pan-STARRS || EOS || align=right | 1.5 km || 
|-id=906 bgcolor=#d6d6d6
| 531906 ||  || — || August 26, 2011 || Haleakala || Pan-STARRS ||  || align=right | 2.2 km || 
|-id=907 bgcolor=#fefefe
| 531907 ||  || — || December 9, 2012 || Mount Lemmon || Mount Lemmon Survey ||  || align=right data-sort-value="0.69" | 690 m || 
|-id=908 bgcolor=#d6d6d6
| 531908 ||  || — || March 11, 2008 || Mount Lemmon || Mount Lemmon Survey ||  || align=right | 3.1 km || 
|-id=909 bgcolor=#d6d6d6
| 531909 ||  || — || January 18, 2013 || Mount Lemmon || Mount Lemmon Survey ||  || align=right | 3.1 km || 
|-id=910 bgcolor=#d6d6d6
| 531910 ||  || — || March 7, 2008 || Kitt Peak || Spacewatch || TIR || align=right | 2.0 km || 
|-id=911 bgcolor=#d6d6d6
| 531911 ||  || — || October 21, 2011 || Mount Lemmon || Mount Lemmon Survey ||  || align=right | 2.3 km || 
|-id=912 bgcolor=#d6d6d6
| 531912 ||  || — || January 19, 2002 || Kitt Peak || Spacewatch ||  || align=right | 2.1 km || 
|-id=913 bgcolor=#fefefe
| 531913 ||  || — || August 26, 2011 || Haleakala || Pan-STARRS ||  || align=right data-sort-value="0.86" | 860 m || 
|-id=914 bgcolor=#FFC2E0
| 531914 ||  || — || January 22, 2013 || Mount Lemmon || Mount Lemmon Survey || APOPHA || align=right data-sort-value="0.73" | 730 m || 
|-id=915 bgcolor=#d6d6d6
| 531915 ||  || — || January 5, 2013 || Mount Lemmon || Mount Lemmon Survey ||  || align=right | 2.6 km || 
|-id=916 bgcolor=#d6d6d6
| 531916 ||  || — || February 29, 2008 || Mount Lemmon || Mount Lemmon Survey ||  || align=right | 2.4 km || 
|-id=917 bgcolor=#C2E0FF
| 531917 ||  || — || January 10, 2010 || Haleakala || Pan-STARRS || res4:7 || align=right | 197 km || 
|-id=918 bgcolor=#d6d6d6
| 531918 ||  || — || January 10, 2007 || Mount Lemmon || Mount Lemmon Survey ||  || align=right | 2.7 km || 
|-id=919 bgcolor=#fefefe
| 531919 ||  || — || September 5, 2008 || Kitt Peak || Spacewatch ||  || align=right data-sort-value="0.50" | 500 m || 
|-id=920 bgcolor=#d6d6d6
| 531920 ||  || — || January 9, 2007 || Kitt Peak || Spacewatch ||  || align=right | 2.6 km || 
|-id=921 bgcolor=#d6d6d6
| 531921 ||  || — || January 10, 2013 || Haleakala || Pan-STARRS ||  || align=right | 2.4 km || 
|-id=922 bgcolor=#d6d6d6
| 531922 ||  || — || January 10, 2013 || Haleakala || Pan-STARRS ||  || align=right | 3.1 km || 
|-id=923 bgcolor=#fefefe
| 531923 ||  || — || January 10, 2013 || Haleakala || Pan-STARRS ||  || align=right data-sort-value="0.81" | 810 m || 
|-id=924 bgcolor=#d6d6d6
| 531924 ||  || — || February 3, 2013 || Haleakala || Pan-STARRS ||  || align=right | 2.5 km || 
|-id=925 bgcolor=#d6d6d6
| 531925 ||  || — || March 6, 2008 || Mount Lemmon || Mount Lemmon Survey || EOS || align=right | 1.9 km || 
|-id=926 bgcolor=#d6d6d6
| 531926 ||  || — || January 5, 2013 || Kitt Peak || Spacewatch ||  || align=right | 2.5 km || 
|-id=927 bgcolor=#d6d6d6
| 531927 ||  || — || January 9, 2008 || Mount Lemmon || Mount Lemmon Survey ||  || align=right | 2.8 km || 
|-id=928 bgcolor=#d6d6d6
| 531928 ||  || — || October 25, 2011 || Haleakala || Pan-STARRS || VER || align=right | 2.4 km || 
|-id=929 bgcolor=#d6d6d6
| 531929 ||  || — || May 1, 2010 || WISE || WISE ||  || align=right | 2.7 km || 
|-id=930 bgcolor=#d6d6d6
| 531930 ||  || — || January 9, 2013 || Kitt Peak || Spacewatch ||  || align=right | 2.8 km || 
|-id=931 bgcolor=#fefefe
| 531931 ||  || — || January 19, 2013 || Kitt Peak || Spacewatch ||  || align=right data-sort-value="0.70" | 700 m || 
|-id=932 bgcolor=#d6d6d6
| 531932 ||  || — || February 6, 2013 || Kitt Peak || Spacewatch ||  || align=right | 3.4 km || 
|-id=933 bgcolor=#d6d6d6
| 531933 ||  || — || October 20, 2012 || Mount Lemmon || Mount Lemmon Survey ||  || align=right | 2.6 km || 
|-id=934 bgcolor=#d6d6d6
| 531934 ||  || — || March 28, 2008 || Kitt Peak || Spacewatch ||  || align=right | 2.0 km || 
|-id=935 bgcolor=#d6d6d6
| 531935 ||  || — || June 30, 2010 || WISE || WISE ||  || align=right | 3.0 km || 
|-id=936 bgcolor=#fefefe
| 531936 ||  || — || December 10, 2005 || Kitt Peak || Spacewatch ||  || align=right data-sort-value="0.70" | 700 m || 
|-id=937 bgcolor=#d6d6d6
| 531937 ||  || — || February 8, 2013 || Haleakala || Pan-STARRS || TIR || align=right | 2.2 km || 
|-id=938 bgcolor=#d6d6d6
| 531938 ||  || — || January 10, 2013 || Haleakala || Pan-STARRS ||  || align=right | 2.3 km || 
|-id=939 bgcolor=#fefefe
| 531939 ||  || — || December 21, 2012 || Mount Lemmon || Mount Lemmon Survey ||  || align=right data-sort-value="0.58" | 580 m || 
|-id=940 bgcolor=#d6d6d6
| 531940 ||  || — || December 24, 2006 || Kitt Peak || Spacewatch ||  || align=right | 2.4 km || 
|-id=941 bgcolor=#fefefe
| 531941 ||  || — || January 8, 2013 || Mount Lemmon || Mount Lemmon Survey ||  || align=right | 1.1 km || 
|-id=942 bgcolor=#C7FF8F
| 531942 ||  || — || January 10, 2013 || Haleakala || Pan-STARRS || centaur || align=right | 20 km || 
|-id=943 bgcolor=#d6d6d6
| 531943 ||  || — || March 30, 2008 || Catalina || CSS ||  || align=right | 2.2 km || 
|-id=944 bgcolor=#FFC2E0
| 531944 ||  || — || February 10, 2013 || Haleakala || Pan-STARRS || AMOPHAcritical || align=right data-sort-value="0.19" | 190 m || 
|-id=945 bgcolor=#fefefe
| 531945 ||  || — || February 6, 2013 || Kitt Peak || Spacewatch ||  || align=right data-sort-value="0.66" | 660 m || 
|-id=946 bgcolor=#d6d6d6
| 531946 ||  || — || November 15, 2006 || Kitt Peak || Spacewatch ||  || align=right | 2.2 km || 
|-id=947 bgcolor=#d6d6d6
| 531947 ||  || — || December 26, 2006 || Kitt Peak || Spacewatch ||  || align=right | 2.0 km || 
|-id=948 bgcolor=#fefefe
| 531948 ||  || — || February 8, 2013 || Haleakala || Pan-STARRS ||  || align=right data-sort-value="0.73" | 730 m || 
|-id=949 bgcolor=#d6d6d6
| 531949 ||  || — || January 5, 2013 || Kitt Peak || Spacewatch || (5931) || align=right | 2.9 km || 
|-id=950 bgcolor=#d6d6d6
| 531950 ||  || — || November 1, 2011 || Kitt Peak || Spacewatch ||  || align=right | 2.2 km || 
|-id=951 bgcolor=#fefefe
| 531951 ||  || — || September 13, 2004 || Kitt Peak || Spacewatch ||  || align=right data-sort-value="0.63" | 630 m || 
|-id=952 bgcolor=#d6d6d6
| 531952 ||  || — || February 9, 2013 || Haleakala || Pan-STARRS ||  || align=right | 2.2 km || 
|-id=953 bgcolor=#d6d6d6
| 531953 ||  || — || February 9, 2008 || Mount Lemmon || Mount Lemmon Survey || EMA || align=right | 2.4 km || 
|-id=954 bgcolor=#fefefe
| 531954 ||  || — || June 9, 2007 || Kitt Peak || Spacewatch ||  || align=right data-sort-value="0.70" | 700 m || 
|-id=955 bgcolor=#fefefe
| 531955 ||  || — || February 14, 2013 || Haleakala || Pan-STARRS ||  || align=right data-sort-value="0.57" | 570 m || 
|-id=956 bgcolor=#d6d6d6
| 531956 ||  || — || February 9, 2013 || Haleakala || Pan-STARRS ||  || align=right | 2.9 km || 
|-id=957 bgcolor=#d6d6d6
| 531957 ||  || — || September 26, 2011 || Mount Lemmon || Mount Lemmon Survey || Tj (2.98) || align=right | 2.7 km || 
|-id=958 bgcolor=#d6d6d6
| 531958 ||  || — || February 1, 2013 || Kitt Peak || Spacewatch || LIX || align=right | 2.9 km || 
|-id=959 bgcolor=#d6d6d6
| 531959 ||  || — || February 5, 2013 || Kitt Peak || Spacewatch ||  || align=right | 2.5 km || 
|-id=960 bgcolor=#d6d6d6
| 531960 ||  || — || February 14, 2013 || Haleakala || Pan-STARRS ||  || align=right | 3.0 km || 
|-id=961 bgcolor=#fefefe
| 531961 ||  || — || February 7, 2013 || Kitt Peak || Spacewatch ||  || align=right data-sort-value="0.64" | 640 m || 
|-id=962 bgcolor=#fefefe
| 531962 ||  || — || February 15, 2013 || Haleakala || Pan-STARRS ||  || align=right data-sort-value="0.57" | 570 m || 
|-id=963 bgcolor=#d6d6d6
| 531963 ||  || — || February 8, 2013 || Kitt Peak || Spacewatch || 3:2 || align=right | 4.1 km || 
|-id=964 bgcolor=#d6d6d6
| 531964 ||  || — || September 24, 2011 || Haleakala || Pan-STARRS ||  || align=right | 2.2 km || 
|-id=965 bgcolor=#d6d6d6
| 531965 ||  || — || January 9, 2013 || Mount Lemmon || Mount Lemmon Survey ||  || align=right | 2.6 km || 
|-id=966 bgcolor=#d6d6d6
| 531966 ||  || — || January 24, 2007 || Kitt Peak || Spacewatch ||  || align=right | 2.5 km || 
|-id=967 bgcolor=#d6d6d6
| 531967 ||  || — || February 13, 2008 || Mount Lemmon || Mount Lemmon Survey ||  || align=right | 2.2 km || 
|-id=968 bgcolor=#d6d6d6
| 531968 ||  || — || January 20, 2013 || Kitt Peak || Spacewatch ||  || align=right | 3.9 km || 
|-id=969 bgcolor=#d6d6d6
| 531969 ||  || — || February 3, 2013 || Haleakala || Pan-STARRS ||  || align=right | 3.8 km || 
|-id=970 bgcolor=#d6d6d6
| 531970 ||  || — || February 8, 2013 || XuYi || PMO NEO || 7:4 || align=right | 3.5 km || 
|-id=971 bgcolor=#d6d6d6
| 531971 ||  || — || January 16, 2013 || Mount Lemmon || Mount Lemmon Survey ||  || align=right | 2.6 km || 
|-id=972 bgcolor=#d6d6d6
| 531972 ||  || — || October 7, 2005 || Kitt Peak || Spacewatch ||  || align=right | 3.1 km || 
|-id=973 bgcolor=#d6d6d6
| 531973 ||  || — || November 27, 2006 || Mount Lemmon || Mount Lemmon Survey || THB || align=right | 2.4 km || 
|-id=974 bgcolor=#fefefe
| 531974 ||  || — || September 30, 2005 || Mount Lemmon || Mount Lemmon Survey ||  || align=right data-sort-value="0.67" | 670 m || 
|-id=975 bgcolor=#d6d6d6
| 531975 ||  || — || December 22, 2006 || Kitt Peak || Spacewatch ||  || align=right | 2.1 km || 
|-id=976 bgcolor=#d6d6d6
| 531976 ||  || — || January 10, 2007 || Kitt Peak || Spacewatch ||  || align=right | 2.4 km || 
|-id=977 bgcolor=#d6d6d6
| 531977 ||  || — || February 8, 2013 || Haleakala || Pan-STARRS ||  || align=right | 2.4 km || 
|-id=978 bgcolor=#d6d6d6
| 531978 ||  || — || January 20, 2013 || Kitt Peak || Spacewatch ||  || align=right | 2.3 km || 
|-id=979 bgcolor=#d6d6d6
| 531979 ||  || — || March 15, 2008 || Mount Lemmon || Mount Lemmon Survey || THM || align=right | 1.9 km || 
|-id=980 bgcolor=#d6d6d6
| 531980 ||  || — || March 8, 2008 || Mount Lemmon || Mount Lemmon Survey ||  || align=right | 1.9 km || 
|-id=981 bgcolor=#fefefe
| 531981 ||  || — || February 7, 2013 || Kitt Peak || Spacewatch ||  || align=right data-sort-value="0.63" | 630 m || 
|-id=982 bgcolor=#d6d6d6
| 531982 ||  || — || April 14, 2008 || Mount Lemmon || Mount Lemmon Survey ||  || align=right | 2.6 km || 
|-id=983 bgcolor=#d6d6d6
| 531983 ||  || — || February 9, 2008 || Kitt Peak || Spacewatch ||  || align=right | 2.2 km || 
|-id=984 bgcolor=#d6d6d6
| 531984 ||  || — || October 24, 2011 || Haleakala || Pan-STARRS ||  || align=right | 2.3 km || 
|-id=985 bgcolor=#d6d6d6
| 531985 ||  || — || January 22, 2013 || Mount Lemmon || Mount Lemmon Survey ||  || align=right | 2.6 km || 
|-id=986 bgcolor=#fefefe
| 531986 ||  || — || January 15, 2013 || Catalina || CSS ||  || align=right data-sort-value="0.63" | 630 m || 
|-id=987 bgcolor=#d6d6d6
| 531987 ||  || — || January 17, 2007 || Kitt Peak || Spacewatch ||  || align=right | 2.0 km || 
|-id=988 bgcolor=#d6d6d6
| 531988 ||  || — || September 1, 2010 || Mount Lemmon || Mount Lemmon Survey ||  || align=right | 2.5 km || 
|-id=989 bgcolor=#fefefe
| 531989 ||  || — || February 5, 2013 || Kitt Peak || Spacewatch ||  || align=right data-sort-value="0.61" | 610 m || 
|-id=990 bgcolor=#d6d6d6
| 531990 ||  || — || March 11, 2008 || Mount Lemmon || Mount Lemmon Survey ||  || align=right | 1.9 km || 
|-id=991 bgcolor=#d6d6d6
| 531991 ||  || — || November 24, 2011 || Mount Lemmon || Mount Lemmon Survey ||  || align=right | 2.3 km || 
|-id=992 bgcolor=#fefefe
| 531992 ||  || — || October 31, 2008 || Kitt Peak || Spacewatch ||  || align=right data-sort-value="0.56" | 560 m || 
|-id=993 bgcolor=#d6d6d6
| 531993 ||  || — || December 27, 2006 || Mount Lemmon || Mount Lemmon Survey ||  || align=right | 2.7 km || 
|-id=994 bgcolor=#d6d6d6
| 531994 ||  || — || February 15, 2013 || Haleakala || Pan-STARRS ||  || align=right | 2.2 km || 
|-id=995 bgcolor=#d6d6d6
| 531995 ||  || — || February 15, 2013 || Haleakala || Pan-STARRS ||  || align=right | 2.5 km || 
|-id=996 bgcolor=#d6d6d6
| 531996 ||  || — || February 8, 2013 || Haleakala || Pan-STARRS || 7:4 || align=right | 3.1 km || 
|-id=997 bgcolor=#d6d6d6
| 531997 ||  || — || February 15, 2013 || Haleakala || Pan-STARRS ||  || align=right | 3.2 km || 
|-id=998 bgcolor=#d6d6d6
| 531998 ||  || — || February 5, 2013 || Kitt Peak || Spacewatch ||  || align=right | 3.0 km || 
|-id=999 bgcolor=#fefefe
| 531999 ||  || — || February 8, 2013 || Haleakala || Pan-STARRS ||  || align=right data-sort-value="0.47" | 470 m || 
|-id=000 bgcolor=#fefefe
| 532000 ||  || — || February 15, 2013 || Haleakala || Pan-STARRS ||  || align=right data-sort-value="0.74" | 740 m || 
|}

References

External links 
 Discovery Circumstances: Numbered Minor Planets (530001)–(535000) (IAU Minor Planet Center)

0531